France, officially the French Republic, is a country located primarily in Western Europe. It also includes overseas regions and territories in the Americas and the Atlantic, Pacific and Indian Oceans, giving it one of the largest discontiguous exclusive economic zones in the world. Its metropolitan area extends from the Rhine to the Atlantic Ocean and from the Mediterranean Sea to the English Channel and the North Sea; overseas territories include French Guiana in South America, Saint Pierre and Miquelon in the North Atlantic, the French West Indies, and many islands in Oceania and the Indian Ocean. France is a unitary semi-presidential republic with its capital in Paris, the country's largest city and main cultural and commercial centre; other major urban areas include Marseille, Lyon, Toulouse, Lille, Bordeaux, and Nice.

Inhabited since the Palaeolithic era, the territory of Metropolitan France was settled by Celtic tribes known as Gauls during the Iron Age. Rome annexed the area in 51 BC, leading to a distinct Gallo-Roman culture that laid the foundation of the French language. The Germanic Franks formed the Kingdom of Francia, which became the heartland of the Carolingian Empire. The Treaty of Verdun of 843 partitioned the empire, with West Francia becoming the Kingdom of France in 987. In the High Middle Ages, France was a powerful but highly decentralised feudal kingdom. Philip II successfully strengthened royal power and defeated his rivals to double the size of the crown lands; by the end of his reign, France had emerged as the most powerful state in Europe. From the mid-14th to the mid-15th century, France was plunged into a series of dynastic conflicts involving England, collectively known as the Hundred Years' War, and a distinct French identity emerged as a result. The French Renaissance saw art and culture flourish, conflict with the House of Habsburg, and the establishment of a global colonial empire, which by the 20th century would become the second-largest in the world. The second half of the 16th century was dominated by religious civil wars between Catholics and Huguenots that severely weakened the country. France again emerged as Europe's dominant power in the 17th century under Louis XIV following the Thirty Years' War. Inadequate economic policies, inequitable taxes and frequent wars (notably a defeat in the Seven Years' War and costly involvement in the American War of Independence) left the kingdom in a precarious economic situation by the end of the 18th century.

France reached its political and military zenith in the early 19th century under Napoleon Bonaparte, subjugating much of continental Europe and establishing the First French Empire. The French Revolutionary and Napoleonic Wars shaped the course of European and world history. The collapse of the empire initiated a period of relative decline, in which France endured a tumultuous succession of governments until the founding of the French Third Republic during the Franco-Prussian War in 1870. Subsequent decades saw a period of optimism, cultural and scientific flourishing, as well as economic prosperity, known as the Belle Époque. France was one of the major participants of World War I, from which it emerged victorious at a great human and economic cost. It was among the Allied powers of World War II but was soon occupied by the Axis in 1940. Following liberation in 1944, the short-lived Fourth Republic was established and later dissolved in the course of the Algerian War. The current Fifth Republic was formed in 1958 by Charles de Gaulle. Algeria and most French colonies became independent in the 1960s, with the majority retaining close economic and military ties with France.

France retains its centuries-long status as a global centre of art, science and philosophy. It hosts the fifth-largest number of UNESCO World Heritage Sites and is the world's leading tourist destination, receiving over 89 million foreign visitors in 2018. France is a developed country ranked 28th in the Human Development Index, with the world's seventh-largest economy by nominal GDP and tenth-largest by PPP; in terms of aggregate household wealth, it ranks fourth in the world. France performs well in international rankings of education, health care, and life expectancy. It remains a great power in global affairs, being one of the five permanent members of the United Nations Security Council and an official nuclear-weapon state. France is a founding and leading member of the European Union and the Eurozone, as well as a key member of the Group of Seven, North Atlantic Treaty Organization (NATO), Organisation for Economic Co-operation and Development (OECD) and Francophonie.

Etymology and pronunciation

Originally applied to the whole Frankish Empire, the name France comes from the Latin , or "realm of the Franks".

The name of the Franks is related to the English word frank ("free"): the latter stems from the Old French   ("free, noble, sincere"), ultimately from Medieval Latin francus ("free, exempt from service; freeman, Frank"), a generalisation of the tribal name that emerged as a Late Latin borrowing of the reconstructed Frankish endonym . It has been suggested that the meaning "free" was adopted because, after the conquest of Gaul, only Franks were free of taxation, or more generally because they had the status of freemen in contrast to servants or slaves.

The etymology of *Frank is uncertain. It is traditionally derived from the Proto-Germanic word , which translates as "javelin" or "lance" (the throwing axe of the Franks was known as the francisca), although these weapons may have been named because of their use by the Franks, not the other way around.

History

Prehistory (before the 6th century BC)

The oldest traces of human life in what is now France date from approximately 1.8 million years ago. Over the ensuing millennia, humans were confronted by a harsh and variable climate, marked by several glacial periods. Early hominids led a nomadic hunter-gatherer life. France has a large number of decorated caves from the Upper Paleolithic era, including one of the most famous and best-preserved, Lascaux (approximately 18,000 BC). At the end of the last glacial period (10,000 BC), the climate became milder; from approximately 7,000 BC, this part of Western Europe entered the Neolithic era and its inhabitants became sedentary.

After strong demographic and agricultural development between the 4th and 3rd millennia, metallurgy appeared at the end of the 3rd millennium, initially working gold, copper and bronze, as well as later iron. France has numerous megalithic sites from the Neolithic period, including the exceptionally dense Carnac stones site (approximately 3,300 BC).

Antiquity (6th century BC–5th century AD)

In 600 BC, Ionian Greeks from Phocaea founded the colony of Massalia (present-day Marseille), on the shores of the Mediterranean Sea. This makes it France's oldest city. At the same time, some Gallic Celtic tribes penetrated parts of Eastern and Northern France, gradually spreading through the rest of the country between the 5th and 3rd century BC. The concept of Gaul emerged during this period, corresponding to the territories of Celtic settlement ranging between the Rhine, the Atlantic Ocean, the Pyrenees and the Mediterranean. The borders of modern France roughly correspond to ancient Gaul, which was inhabited by Celtic Gauls. Gaul was then a prosperous country, of which the southernmost part was heavily subject to Greek and Roman cultural and economic influences.

Around 390 BC, the Gallic chieftain Brennus and his troops made their way to Italy through the Alps, defeated the Romans in the Battle of the Allia, and besieged and ransomed Rome. The Gallic invasion left Rome weakened, and the Gauls continued to harass the region until 345 BC when they entered into a formal peace treaty with Rome. But the Romans and the Gauls would remain adversaries for the next centuries, and the Gauls would continue to be a threat in Italy.

Around 125 BC, the south of Gaul was conquered by the Romans, who called this region  ("Our Province"), which over time evolved into the name Provence in French. Julius Caesar conquered the remainder of Gaul and overcame a revolt carried out by the Gallic chieftain Vercingetorix in 52 BC.

Gaul was divided by Augustus into Roman provinces. Many cities were founded during the Gallo-Roman period, including Lugdunum (present-day Lyon), which is considered the capital of the Gauls. These cities were built in traditional Roman style, with a forum, a theatre, a circus, an amphitheatre and thermal baths. The Gauls mixed with Roman settlers and eventually adopted Roman culture and Roman speech (Latin, from which the French language evolved). Roman polytheism merged with Gallic paganism into the same syncretism.

From the 250s to the 280s AD, Roman Gaul suffered a serious crisis with its fortified borders being attacked on several occasions by barbarians. Nevertheless, the situation improved in the first half of the 4th century, which was a period of revival and prosperity for Roman Gaul. In 312, Emperor Constantine I converted to Christianity. Subsequently, Christians, who had been persecuted until then, increased rapidly across the entire Roman Empire. But, from the beginning of the 5th century, the Barbarian Invasions resumed. Teutonic tribes invaded the region from present-day Germany, the Visigoths settling in the southwest, the Burgundians along the Rhine River Valley, and the Franks (from whom the French take their name) in the north.

Early Middle Ages (5th–10th century)

At the end of the Antiquity period, ancient Gaul was divided into several Germanic kingdoms and a remaining Gallo-Roman territory, known as the Kingdom of Syagrius. Simultaneously, Celtic Britons, fleeing the Anglo-Saxon settlement of Britain, settled in the western part of Armorica. As a result, the Armorican peninsula was renamed Brittany, Celtic culture was revived and independent petty kingdoms arose in this region.

The first leader to make himself king of all the Franks was Clovis I, who began his reign in 481, routing the last forces of the Roman governors of the province in 486. Clovis claimed that he would be baptised a Christian in the event of his victory against the Visigoths, which was said to have guaranteed the battle. Clovis regained the southwest from the Visigoths, was baptised in 508 and made himself master of what is now western Germany.

Clovis I was the first Germanic conqueror after the fall of the Roman Empire to convert to Catholic Christianity, rather than Arianism; thus France was given the title "Eldest daughter of the Church" by the papacy, and French kings would be called "the Most Christian Kings of France".

The Franks embraced the Christian Gallo-Roman culture and ancient Gaul was eventually renamed Francia ("Land of the Franks"). The Germanic Franks adopted Romanic languages, except in northern Gaul where Roman settlements were less dense and where Germanic languages emerged. Clovis made Paris his capital and established the Merovingian dynasty, but his kingdom would not survive his death. The Franks treated land purely as a private possession and divided it among their heirs, so four kingdoms emerged from that of Clovis: Paris, Orléans, Soissons, and Rheims. The last Merovingian kings lost power to their mayors of the palace (head of household). One mayor of the palace, Charles Martel, defeated an Umayyad invasion of Gaul at the Battle of Tours (732) and earned respect and power within the Frankish kingdoms. His son, Pepin the Short, seized the crown of Francia from the weakened Merovingians and founded the Carolingian dynasty. Pepin's son, Charlemagne, reunited the Frankish kingdoms and built a vast empire across Western and Central Europe.

Proclaimed Holy Roman Emperor by Pope Leo III and thus establishing in earnest the French Government's longtime historical association with the Catholic Church, Charlemagne tried to revive the Western Roman Empire and its cultural grandeur. Charlemagne's son, Louis I (Emperor 814–840), kept the empire united; however, this Carolingian Empire would not survive his death. In 843, under the Treaty of Verdun, the empire was divided between Louis' three sons, with East Francia going to Louis the German, Middle Francia to Lothair I, and West Francia to Charles the Bald. West Francia approximated the area occupied by and was the precursor to, modern France.

During the 9th and 10th centuries, continually threatened by Viking invasions, France became a very decentralised state: the nobility's titles and lands became hereditary, and the authority of the king became more religious than secular and thus was less effective and constantly challenged by powerful noblemen. Thus was established feudalism in France. Over time, some of the king's vassals would grow so powerful that they often posed a threat to the king. For example, after the Battle of Hastings in 1066, William the Conqueror added "King of England" to his titles, becoming both the vassal to (as Duke of Normandy) and the equal of (as king of England) the king of France, creating recurring tensions.

High and Late Middle Ages (10th–15th century)

The Carolingian dynasty ruled France until 987, when Hugh Capet, Duke of France and Count of Paris, was crowned King of the Franks. His descendantsthe Capetians, the House of Valois and the House of Bourbonprogressively unified the country through wars and dynastic inheritance into the Kingdom of France, which was fully declared in 1190 by Philip II of France (Philippe Auguste). Later kings would expand their directly possessed domaine royal to cover over half of modern continental France by the 15th century, including most of the north, centre and west of France. During this process, the royal authority became more and more assertive, centred on a hierarchically conceived society distinguishing nobility, clergy, and commoners.

The French nobility played a prominent role in most Crusades to restore Christian access to the Holy Land. French knights made up the bulk of the steady flow of reinforcements throughout the two-hundred-year span of the Crusades, in such a fashion that the Arabs uniformly referred to the crusaders as Franj caring little whether they came from France. The French Crusaders also imported the French language into the Levant, making French the base of the lingua franca (lit. "Frankish language") of the Crusader states. French knights also made up the majority in both the Hospital and the Temple orders. The latter, in particular, held numerous properties throughout France and by the 13th century were the principal bankers for the French crown, until Philip IV annihilated the order in 1307. The Albigensian Crusade was launched in 1209 to eliminate the heretical Cathars in the southwestern area of modern-day France. In the end, the Cathars were exterminated and the autonomous County of Toulouse was annexed into the crown lands of France.

From the 11th century, the House of Plantagenet, the rulers of the County of Anjou, succeeded in establishing its dominion over the surrounding provinces of Maine and Touraine, then progressively built an "empire" that spanned from England to the Pyrenees and covering half of modern France. Tensions between the kingdom of France and the Plantagenet empire would last a hundred years, until Philip II of France conquered, between 1202 and 1214, most of the continental possessions of the empire, leaving England and Aquitaine to the Plantagenets.

Charles IV the Fair died without an heir in 1328. Under Salic law the crown of France could not pass to a woman nor could the line of kingship pass through the female line. Accordingly, the crown passed to Philip of Valois, rather than through the female line to Edward of Plantagenet, who would soon become Edward III of England. During the reign of Philip of Valois, the French monarchy reached the height of its medieval power. However Philip's seat on the throne was contested by Edward III of England in 1337, and England and France entered the off-and-on Hundred Years' War. The exact boundaries changed greatly with time, but landholdings inside France by the English Kings remained extensive for decades. With charismatic leaders, such as Joan of Arc and La Hire, strong French counterattacks won back most English continental territories. Like the rest of Europe, France was struck by the Black Death due to which half of the 17 million population of France died.

Early modern period (15th century–1789)

The French Renaissance saw spectacular cultural development and the first standardisation of the French language, which would become the official language of France and the language of Europe's aristocracy. It also saw a long set of wars, known as the Italian Wars, between France and the House of Habsburg. French explorers, such as Jacques Cartier or Samuel de Champlain, claimed lands in the Americas for France, paving the way for the expansion of the French colonial empire. The rise of Protestantism in Europe led France to a civil war known as the French Wars of Religion, where, in the most notorious incident, thousands of Huguenots were murdered in the St. Bartholomew's Day massacre of 1572. The Wars of Religion were ended by Henry IV's Edict of Nantes, which granted some freedom of religion to the Huguenots. Spanish troops, the terror of Western Europe, assisted the Catholic side during the Wars of Religion in 1589–1594, and invaded northern France in 1597; after some skirmishing in the 1620s and 1630s, Spain and France returned to all-out war between 1635 and 1659. The war cost France 300,000 casualties.

Under Louis XIII,  Cardinal Richelieu promoted the centralisation of the state and reinforced royal power by disarming domestic power holders in the 1620s. He systematically destroyed castles of defiant lords and denounced the use of private violence (dueling, carrying weapons and maintaining private armies). By the end of the 1620s, Richelieu established "the royal monopoly of force" as the doctrine.

From the 16th to the 19th century, France was responsible for 11% of the transatlantic slave trade, second only to Great Britain during the 18th century. While the state began condoning the practice with letters patent in the 1630s, Louis XIII only formalized this authorization more generally in 1642 in the last year of his reign.  By the mid-18th century, Nantes had become the primary port involved.

During Louis XIV's minority and the regency of Queen Anne and Cardinal Mazarin, a period of trouble known as the Fronde occurred in France. This rebellion was driven by the great feudal lords and sovereign courts as a reaction to the rise of royal absolute power in France.

The monarchy reached its peak during the 17th century and the reign of Louis XIV (1643–1715). By turning powerful feudal lords into courtiers at the Palace of Versailles, his command of the military went unchallenged. Remembered for numerous wars, the so-called Sun King made France the leading European power. France became the most populous country in Europe and had tremendous influence over European politics, economy, and culture. French became the most-used language in diplomacy, science, literature and international affairs, and remained so until the 20th century. During his reign, France took colonial control of many overseas territories in the Americas, Africa and Asia. In 1685, Louis XIV revoked the Edict of Nantes, forcing thousands of Huguenots into exile and published the Code Noir providing the legal framework for slavery and expelling Jewish people from the French colonies.

Under the wars of Louis XV (r. 1715–1774), France lost New France and most of its Indian possessions after its defeat in the Seven Years' War (1756–1763). Its European territory kept growing, however, with notable acquisitions such as Lorraine (1766) and Corsica (1770). An unpopular king, Louis XV's weak rule, his ill-advised financial, political and military decisions – as well as the debauchery of his court– discredited the monarchy, which arguably paved the way for the French Revolution 15 years after his death.

Louis XVI (r. 1774–1793), actively supported the Americans with money, fleets and armies, helping them win independence from Great Britain. France gained revenge but spent so heavily that the government verged on bankruptcy—a factor that contributed to the French Revolution. Some of the Enlightenment occurred in French intellectual circles, and major scientific breakthroughs and inventions, such as the discovery of oxygen (1778) and the first hot air balloon carrying passengers (1783), were achieved by French scientists. French explorers, such as Bougainville and Lapérouse, took part in the voyages of scientific exploration through maritime expeditions around the globe. The Enlightenment philosophy, in which reason is advocated as the primary source of legitimacy, undermined the power of and support for the monarchy and also was a factor in the French Revolution.

Revolutionary France (1789–1799)

Facing financial troubles, King Louis XVI summoned the Estates-General (gathering the three Estates of the realm) in May 1789 to propose solutions to his government. As it came to an impasse, the representatives of the Third Estate formed a National Assembly, signaling the outbreak of the French Revolution. Fearing that the king would suppress the newly created National Assembly, insurgents stormed the Bastille on 14 July 1789, a date which would become France's National Day.

In early August 1789, the National Constituent Assembly abolished the privileges of the nobility such as personal serfdom and exclusive hunting rights. Through the Declaration of the Rights of Man and of the Citizen (27 August 1789), France established fundamental rights for men. The Declaration affirms "the natural and imprescriptible rights of man" to "liberty, property, security and resistance to oppression". Freedom of speech and press were declared, and arbitrary arrests were outlawed. It called for the destruction of aristocratic privileges and proclaimed freedom and equal rights for all men, as well as access to public office based on talent rather than birth. In November 1789, the Assembly decided to nationalise and sell all property of the Catholic Church which had been the largest landowner in the country. In July 1790, a Civil Constitution of the Clergy reorganised the French Catholic Church, cancelling the authority of the Church to levy taxes, et cetera. This fueled much discontent in parts of France, which would contribute to the civil war breaking out some years later. While King Louis XVI still enjoyed popularity among the population, his disastrous flight to Varennes (June 1791) seemed to justify rumours he had tied his hopes of political salvation to the prospects of foreign invasion. His credibility was so deeply undermined that the abolition of the monarchy and the establishment of a republic became an increasing possibility.

In the August 1791 Declaration of Pillnitz, the Emperor of Austria and the King of Prussia  threatened to restore the French monarch by force. In September 1791, the National Constituent Assembly forced King Louis XVI to accept the French Constitution of 1791, thus turning the French absolute monarchy into a constitutional monarchy. In the newly established Legislative Assembly (October 1791), enmity developed and deepened between a group, later called the 'Girondins', who favoured war with Austria and Prussia, and a group later called 'Montagnards' or 'Jacobins', who opposed such a war. A majority in the Assembly in 1792 however saw a war with Austria and Prussia as a chance to boost the popularity of the revolutionary government and thought that such a war could be won and so declared war on Austria on 20 April 1792.

On 10 August 1792, an angry crowd threatened the palace of King Louis XVI, who took refuge in the Legislative Assembly. A Prussian Army invaded France later in August 1792. In early September, Parisians, infuriated by the Prussian Army capturing Verdun and counter-revolutionary uprisings in the west of France, murdered between 1,000 and 1,500 prisoners by raiding the Parisian prisons. The Assembly and the Paris City Council seemed unable to stop that bloodshed. The National Convention, chosen in the first elections under male universal suffrage, on 20 September 1792 succeeded the Legislative Assembly and on 21 September abolished the monarchy by proclaiming the French First Republic.
Ex-King Louis XVI was convicted of treason and guillotined in January 1793.
France had declared war on Great Britain and the Dutch Republic in November 1792 and did the same on Spain in March 1793; in the spring of 1793, Austria and Prussia invaded France; in March, France created a "sister republic" in the "Republic of Mainz", and kept it under control.

Also in March 1793, the civil war of the Vendée against Paris started, evoked by both the Civil Constitution of the Clergy of 1790 and the nationwide army conscription in early 1793; elsewhere in France rebellion was brewing too. A factionalist feud in the National Convention, smouldering ever since October 1791, came to a climax with the group of the 'Girondins' on 2 June 1793 being forced to resign and leave the convention. The counter-revolution, begun in March 1793 in the Vendée, by July had spread to Brittany, Normandy, Bordeaux, Marseilles, Toulon, and Lyon. Paris' Convention government between October and December 1793 with brutal measures managed to subdue most internal uprisings, at the cost of tens of thousands of lives. Some historians consider the civil war to have lasted until 1796 with a toll of possibly 450,000 lives. By the end of 1793, the allies had been driven from France. France in February 1794 abolished slavery in its American colonies but would reintroduce it later.

Political disagreements and enmity in the National Convention between October 1793 and July 1794 reached unprecedented levels, leading to dozens of Convention members being sentenced to death and guillotined. Meanwhile, France's external wars in 1794 were prospering, for example in Belgium. In 1795, the government seemed to return to indifference towards the desires and needs of the lower classes concerning freedom of (Catholic) religion and fair distribution of food. Until 1799, politicians, apart from inventing a new parliamentary system (the 'Directory'), busied themselves with dissuading the people from Catholicism and royalism.

Napoleon and 19th century (1799–1914)

Napoleon Bonaparte seized control of the Republic in 1799 becoming First Consul and later Emperor of the French Empire (1804–1814; 1815). As a continuation of the wars sparked by the European monarchies against the French Republic, changing sets of European Coalitions declared wars on Napoleon's Empire. His armies conquered most of continental Europe with swift victories such as the battles of Jena-Auerstadt or Austerlitz. Members of the Bonaparte family were appointed as monarchs in some of the newly established kingdoms.

These victories led to the worldwide expansion of French revolutionary ideals and reforms, such as the metric system, the Napoleonic Code and the Declaration of the Rights of Man. In June 1812, Napoleon attacked Russia, reaching Moscow. Thereafter his army disintegrated through supply problems, disease, Russian attacks, and finally winter. After the catastrophic Russian campaign, and the ensuing uprising of European monarchies against his rule, Napoleon was defeated and the Bourbon monarchy restored. About a million Frenchmen died during the Napoleonic Wars. After his brief return from exile, Napoleon was finally defeated in 1815 at the Battle of Waterloo, the monarchy was re-established (1815–1830), with new constitutional limitations.

The discredited Bourbon dynasty was overthrown by the July Revolution of 1830, which established the constitutional July Monarchy. In that year, French troops began the conquest of Algeria, establishing the first colonial presence in Africa since Napoleon's abortive invasion of Egypt in 1798. In 1848, general unrest led to the February Revolution and the end of the July Monarchy. The abolition of slavery and the introduction of male universal suffrage, which were briefly enacted during the French Revolution, was re-enacted in 1848. In 1852, the president of the French Republic, Louis-Napoléon Bonaparte, Napoleon I's nephew, was proclaimed emperor of the Second Empire, as Napoleon III. He multiplied French interventions abroad, especially in Crimea, Mexico and Italy which resulted in the annexation of the Duchy of Savoy and the County of Nice, then part of the Kingdom of Sardinia. Napoleon III was unseated following defeat in the Franco-Prussian War of 1870 and his regime was replaced by the Third Republic. By 1875, the French conquest of Algeria was complete, and approximately 825,000 Algerians had been killed from famine, disease, and violence.

France had colonial possessions, in various forms, since the beginning of the 17th century, but in the 19th and 20th centuries, its global overseas colonial empire extended greatly and became the second-largest in the world behind the British Empire. Including metropolitan France, the total area of land under French sovereignty almost reached 13 million square kilometres in the 1920s and 1930s, 8.6% of the world's land. Known as the Belle Époque, the turn of the century was a period characterised by optimism, regional peace, economic prosperity and technological, scientific and cultural innovations. In 1905, state secularism was officially established.

Early to mid-20th century (1914–1946)

France was invaded by Germany and defended by Great Britain to start World War I in August 1914. A rich industrial area in the northeast was occupied. France and the Allies emerged victorious against the Central Powers at a tremendous human and material cost. World War I left 1.4 million French soldiers dead, 4% of its population. 

Between 27 and 30% of soldiers conscripted from 1912 to 1915 were killed. The interbellum years were marked by intense international tensions and a variety of social reforms introduced by the Popular Front government (annual leave, eight-hour workdays, women in government).

In 1940, France was invaded and quickly defeated by Nazi Germany. France was divided into a German occupation zone in the north, an Italian occupation zone in the southeast and an unoccupied territory, the rest of France, which consisted of the southern French metropolitan territory (two-fifths of pre-war metropolitan France) and the French empire, which included the two protectorates of French Tunisia and French Morocco, and French Algeria; the Vichy government, a newly established authoritarian regime collaborating with Germany, ruled the unoccupied territory. Free France, the government-in-exile led by Charles de Gaulle, was set up in London.

From 1942 to 1944, about 160,000 French citizens, including around 75,000 Jews, were deported to death camps and concentration camps in Germany and occupied Poland. In September 1943, Corsica was the first French metropolitan territory to liberate itself from the Axis. On 6 June 1944, the Allies invaded Normandy and in August they invaded Provence. Over the following year, the Allies and the French Resistance emerged victorious over the Axis powers and French sovereignty was restored with the establishment of the Provisional Government of the French Republic (GPRF). This interim government, established by de Gaulle, aimed to continue to wage war against Germany and to purge collaborators from office. It also made several important reforms (suffrage extended to women, the creation of a social security system).

Contemporary period (1946–present)

The GPRF laid the groundwork for a new constitutional order that resulted in the Fourth Republic (1946–1958), which saw spectacular economic growth (les Trente Glorieuses). France was one of the founding members of NATO (1949). France attempted to regain control of French Indochina but was defeated by the Viet Minh in 1954 at the climactic Battle of Dien Bien Phu. Only months later, France faced another anti-colonialist conflict in Algeria, then treated as an integral part of France and home to over one million European settlers. During the conflict, the French systematically used torture and repression, including extrajudicial killings to keep control of Algeria.
This conflict wracked the country and nearly led to a coup and civil war in France.

During the May 1958 crisis, the weak and unstable Fourth Republic gave way to the Fifth Republic, which included a strengthened Presidency. In the latter role, Charles de Gaulle managed to keep the country together while taking steps to end the Algerian War. The war was concluded with the Évian Accords in 1962 which led to Algerian independence. Algerian independence came at a high price: it resulted in between half a million and one million deaths and over 2 million internally displaced Algerians. Around one million Pied-Noirs and Harkis fled from Algeria to France upon independence. A vestige of the colonial empire are the French overseas departments and territories.

In the context of the Cold War, De Gaulle pursued a policy of "national independence" towards the Western and Eastern blocs. To this end, he withdrew from NATO's military-integrated command (while remaining in the NATO alliance itself), launched a nuclear development programme and made France the fourth nuclear power. He restored cordial Franco-German relations to create a European counterweight between the American and Soviet spheres of influence. However, he opposed any development of a supranational Europe, favouring a Europe of sovereign nations. In the wake of the series of worldwide protests of 1968, the revolt of May 1968 had an enormous social impact. In France, it was the watershed moment when a conservative moral ideal (religion, patriotism, respect for authority) shifted towards a more liberal moral ideal (secularism, individualism, sexual revolution). Although the revolt was a political failure (as the Gaullist party emerged even stronger than before) it announced a split between the French people and de Gaulle who resigned shortly after.

In the post-Gaullist era, France remained one of the most developed economies in the world but faced several economic crises that resulted in high unemployment rates and increasing public debt. In the late 20th and early 21st centuries, France has been at the forefront of the development of a supranational European Union, notably by signing the Maastricht Treaty (which created the European Union) in 1992, establishing the Eurozone in 1999 and signing the Lisbon Treaty in 2007. France has also gradually but fully reintegrated into NATO and has since participated in most NATO-sponsored wars.

Since the 19th century, France has received many immigrants. These have been mostly male foreign workers from European Catholic countries who generally returned home when not employed. During the 1970s France faced an economic crisis and allowed new immigrants (mostly from the Maghreb) to permanently settle in France with their families and acquire French citizenship. It resulted in hundreds of thousands of Muslims (especially in the larger cities) living in subsidised public housing and suffering from very high unemployment rates. Simultaneously France renounced the assimilation of immigrants, where they were expected to adhere to French traditional values and cultural norms. They were encouraged to retain their distinctive cultures and traditions and required merely to integrate.

Since the 1995 Paris Métro and RER bombings, France has been sporadically targeted by Islamist organisations, notably the Charlie Hebdo attack in January 2015 which provoked the largest public rallies in French history, gathering 4.4 million people, the November 2015 Paris attacks which resulted in 130 deaths, the deadliest attack on French soil since World War II and the deadliest in the European Union since the Madrid train bombings in 2004, as well as the 2016 Nice truck attack, which caused 87 deaths during Bastille Day celebrations. Opération Chammal, France's military efforts to contain ISIS, killed over 1,000 ISIS troops between 2014 and 2015.

Geography

Location and borders

The vast majority of France's territory and population is situated in Western Europe and is called Metropolitan France, to distinguish it from the country's various overseas polities. It is bordered by the North Sea in the north, the English Channel in the northwest, the Atlantic Ocean in the west and the Mediterranean sea in the southeast. Its land borders consist of Belgium and Luxembourg in the northeast, Germany and Switzerland in the east, Italy and Monaco in the southeast, and Andorra and Spain in the south and southwest. Except for the northeast, most of France's land borders are roughly delineated by natural boundaries and geographic features: to the south and southeast, the Pyrenees and the Alps and the Jura, respectively, and to the east, the Rhine river. Metropolitan France includes various coastal islands, of which the largest is Corsica. Metropolitan France is situated mostly between latitudes 41° and 51° N, and longitudes 6° W and 10° E, on the western edge of Europe, and thus lies within the northern temperate zone. Its continental part covers about 1000 km from north to south and from east to west.

France has several overseas regions across the world, which are organised as follows:
 five have the same status as mainland France's regions and departments:
 French Guiana in South America;
 Guadeloupe in the Caribbean;
 Martinique in the Caribbean;
 Mayotte in the Indian Ocean, off the coast of East Africa;
 Réunion in the Indian Ocean, off the coast of East Africa.
 nine have special legal status distinct from mainland France's regions and departments:
 In the Atlantic Ocean: Saint Pierre and Miquelon and, in the Antilles: Saint Martin and Saint Barthélemy.
 In the Pacific Ocean: French Polynesia, the special collectivity of New Caledonia, Wallis and Futuna and Clipperton Island.
 In the Indian Ocean: the Kerguelen Islands, Crozet Islands, St. Paul and Amsterdam islands, and the Scattered Islands in the Indian Ocean
 In the Antarctic: Adélie Land.

France has land borders with Brazil and Suriname via French Guiana and with the Kingdom of the Netherlands through the French portion of Saint Martin.

France possesses a wide variety of landscapes, from coastal plains in the north and west to mountain ranges of the Alps in the southeast, the Massif Central in the south-central and Pyrenees in the southwest.

Its EEZ covers approximately 8% of the total surface of all the EEZs of the world.

Geology, topography and hydrography

Metropolitan France has a wide variety of topographical sets and natural landscapes. Large parts of the current territory of France were raised during several tectonic episodes like the Hercynian uplift in the Paleozoic Era, during which the Armorican Massif, the Massif Central, the Morvan, the Vosges and Ardennes ranges and the island of Corsica were formed. These massifs delineate several sedimentary basins such as the Aquitaine basin in the southwest and the Paris basin in the north, the latter including several areas of particularly fertile ground such as the silt beds of Beauce and Brie. Various routes of natural passage, such as the Rhône Valley, allow easy communication. The Alpine, Pyrenean and Jura mountains are much younger and have less eroded forms. Although 60% of municipalities are classified as having seismic risks, these risks remain moderate.

The coastlines offer contrasting landscapes: mountain ranges along the French Riviera, coastal cliffs such as the Côte d'Albâtre, and wide sandy plains in the Languedoc. Corsica lies off the Mediterranean coast. France has an extensive river system consisting of the four major rivers Seine, the Loire, the Garonne, the Rhône and their tributaries, whose combined catchment includes over 62% of the metropolitan territory. The Rhône divides the Massif Central from the Alps and flows into the Mediterranean Sea at the Camargue. The Garonne meets the Dordogne just after Bordeaux, forming the Gironde estuary, the largest estuary in Western Europe which after approximately  empties into the Atlantic Ocean. Other water courses drain towards the Meuse and Rhine along the northeastern borders. France has  of marine waters within three oceans under its jurisdiction, of which 97% are overseas.

Environment

France was one of the first countries to create an environment ministry, in 1971. Although it is one of the most industrialised countries in the world, France is ranked only 19th by carbon dioxide emissions, behind less populous nations such as Canada or Australia. This is due to the country's heavy investment in nuclear power following the 1973 oil crisis, which now accounts for 75 percent of its electricity production and results in less pollution. According to the 2020 Environmental Performance Index conducted by Yale and Columbia, France was the fifth most environmentally conscious country in the world (behind the United Kingdom).

Like all European Union state members, France agreed to cut carbon emissions by at least 20% of 1990 levels by 2020, compared to the United States' plan to reduce emissions by 4% of 1990 levels. , French carbon dioxide emissions per capita were lower than that of China. The country was set to impose a carbon tax in 2009 at 17 euros per tonne of carbon emitted, which would have raised 4 billion euros of revenue annually. However, the plan was abandoned due to fears of burdening French businesses.

Forests account for 31 percent of France's land area—the fourth-highest proportion in Europe—representing an increase of 7 percent since 1990. French forests are some of the most diverse in Europe, comprising more than 140 species of trees. France had a 2018 Forest Landscape Integrity Index mean score of 4.52/10, ranking it 123rd globally out of 172 countries. There are nine national parks and 46 natural parks in France, with the government planning to convert 20% of its Exclusive economic zone into a Marine protected area by 2020. A regional nature park ( or PNR) is a public establishment in France between local authorities and the national government covering an inhabited rural area of outstanding beauty, to protect the scenery and heritage as well as setting up sustainable economic development in the area. A PNR sets goals and guidelines for managed human habitation, sustainable economic development and protection of the natural environment based on each park's unique landscape and heritage. The parks foster ecological research programmes and public education in the natural sciences.  there are 54 PNRs in France.

Administrative divisions

The French Republic is divided into 18 regions (located in Europe and overseas), five overseas collectivities, one overseas territory, one special collectivity – New Caledonia and one uninhabited island directly under the authority of the Minister of Overseas France – Clipperton.

Regions

Since 2016, France is divided into 18 administrative regions: 13 regions in metropolitan France (including Corsica), and five overseas. The regions are further subdivided into 101 departments, which are numbered mainly alphabetically. The department number is used in postal codes and was formerly used on vehicle registration plates. Among the 101 French departments, five (French Guiana, Guadeloupe, Martinique, Mayotte, and Réunion) are in overseas regions (ROMs) that are simultaneously overseas departments (DOMs), enjoying the same status as metropolitan departments and are thereby included in the European Union.

The 101 departments are subdivided into 335 arrondissements, which are, in turn, subdivided into 2,054 cantons. These cantons are then divided into 36,658 communes, which are municipalities with an elected municipal council. Three communes—Paris, Lyon and Marseille—are subdivided into 45 municipal arrondissements.

The regions, departments and communes are all known as territorial collectivities, meaning they possess local assemblies as well as an executive. Today, arrondissements and cantons are merely administrative divisions. However, this was not always the case. Until 1940, the arrondissements were territorial collectivities with an elected assembly, but these were suspended by the Vichy regime and abolished by the Fourth Republic in 1946.

Overseas territories and collectivities

In addition to the 18 regions and 101 departments, the French Republic has five overseas collectivities (French Polynesia, Saint Barthélemy, Saint Martin, Saint Pierre and Miquelon, and Wallis and Futuna), one sui generis collectivity (New Caledonia), one overseas territory (French Southern and Antarctic Lands), and one island possession in the Pacific Ocean (Clipperton Island).

Overseas collectivities and territories form part of the French Republic, but do not form part of the European Union or its fiscal area (except for St. Bartelemy, which seceded from Guadeloupe in 2007). The Pacific Collectivities (COMs) of French Polynesia, Wallis and Futuna, and New Caledonia continue to use the CFP franc whose value is strictly linked to that of the euro. In contrast, the five overseas regions used the French franc and now use the euro.

Government and politics

Government

France is a representative democracy organised as a unitary, semi-presidential republic. As one of the earliest republics of the modern world, democratic traditions and values are deeply rooted in French culture, identity and politics. The Constitution of the Fifth Republic was approved by referendum on 28 September 1958, establishing a framework consisting of executive, legislative and judicial branches. It sought to address the instability of the Third and Fourth Republics by combining elements of both parliamentary and presidential systems, while greatly strengthening the authority of the executive relative to the legislature.

The executive branch has two leaders. The President of the Republic, currently Emmanuel Macron, is the head of state, elected directly by universal adult suffrage for a five-year term. The Prime Minister, currently Élisabeth Borne, is the head of government, appointed by the President to lead the government. The President has the power to dissolve Parliament or circumvent it by submitting referendums directly to the people; the President also appoints judges and civil servants, negotiates and ratifies international agreements, as well as serves as commander-in-chief of the Armed Forces. The Prime Minister determines public policy and oversees the civil service, with an emphasis on domestic matters. In the 2022 presidential election president Macron was re-elected.

The legislature consists of the French Parliament, a bicameral body made up of a lower house, the National Assembly (Assemblée nationale) and an upper house, the Senate. Legislators in the National Assembly, known as députés, represent local constituencies and are directly elected for five-year terms. The Assembly has the power to dismiss the government by majority vote. Senators are chosen by an electoral college for six-year terms, with half the seats submitted to election every three years. The Senate's legislative powers are limited; in the event of disagreement between the two chambers, the National Assembly has the final say. The parliament is responsible for determining the rules and principles concerning most areas of law, political amnesty, and fiscal policy; however, the government may draft specific details concerning most laws.

Until World War II, Radicals were a strong political force in France, embodied by the Republican, Radical and Radical-Socialist Party which was the most important party of the Third Republic. From World War II until 2017, French politics was dominated by two politically opposed groupings: one left-wing, the French Section of the Workers' International, which was succeeded by the Socialist Party (in 1969); and the other right-wing, the Gaullist Party, whose name changed over time to the Rally of the French People (1947), the Union of Democrats for the Republic (1958), the Rally for the Republic (1976), the Union for a Popular Movement (2007) and The Republicans (since 2015). In the 2017 presidential and legislative elections, the radical centrist party La République En Marche! (LREM) became the dominant force, overtaking both Socialists and Republicans. LREM's opponent in the second round of the 2017 and 2022 presidential elections was the growing far-right party National Rally. Since 2020, Europe Ecology – The Greens have performed well in mayoral elections in major cities while on a national level, an alliance of Left parties (the NUPES) was the second-largest voting block elected to the lower house in 2022.

The electorate is constitutionally empowered to vote on amendments passed by the Parliament and bills submitted by the president. Referendums have played a key role in shaping French politics and even foreign policy; voters have decided on such matters as Algeria's independence, the election of the president by popular vote, the formation of the EU, and the reduction of presidential term limits. Waning civic participation has been a matter of vigorous public debate, with a majority of the public reportedly supporting mandatory voting as a solution in 2019.

Law

France uses a civil legal system, wherein law arises primarily from written statutes; judges are not to make law, but merely to interpret it (though the amount of judicial interpretation in certain areas makes it equivalent to case law in a common law system). Basic principles of the rule of law were laid in the Napoleonic Code (which was, in turn, largely based on the royal law codified under Louis XIV). In agreement with the principles of the Declaration of the Rights of Man and of the Citizen, the law should only prohibit actions detrimental to society. As Guy Canivet, first president of the Court of Cassation wrote about the management of prisons: "Freedom is the rule, and its restriction is the exception; any restriction of Freedom must be provided for by Law and must follow the principles of necessity and proportionality." That is, Law should lay out prohibitions only if they are needed, and if the inconveniences caused by this restriction do not exceed the inconveniences that the prohibition is supposed to remedy.

French law is divided into two principal areas: private law and public law. Private law includes, in particular, civil law and criminal law. Public law includes, in particular, administrative law and constitutional law. However, in practical terms, French law comprises three principal areas of law: civil law, criminal law, and administrative law. Criminal laws can only address the future and not the past (criminal ex post facto laws are prohibited). While administrative law is often a subcategory of civil law in many countries, it is completely separated in France and each body of law is headed by a specific supreme court: ordinary courts (which handle criminal and civil litigation) are headed by the Court of Cassation and administrative courts are headed by the Council of State. To be applicable, every law must be officially published in the Journal officiel de la République française.

France does not recognise religious law as a motivation for the enactment of prohibitions; it has long abolished blasphemy laws and sodomy laws (the latter in 1791). However, "offences against public decency" (contraires aux bonnes mœurs) or disturbing public order (trouble à l'ordre public) have been used to repress public expressions of homosexuality or street prostitution. Since 1999, civil unions for homosexual couples are permitted, and since 2013, same-sex marriage and LGBT adoption are legal. Laws prohibiting discriminatory speech in the press are as old as 1881. Some consider hate speech laws in France to be too broad or severe, undermining freedom of speech.
France has laws against racism and antisemitism, while the 1990 Gayssot Act prohibits Holocaust denial.

Freedom of religion is constitutionally guaranteed by the 1789 Declaration of the Rights of Man and of the Citizen. The 1905 French law on the Separation of the Churches and the State is the basis for laïcité (state secularism): the state does not formally recognise any religion, except in Alsace-Moselle. Nonetheless, it does recognise religious associations. The Parliament has listed many religious movements as dangerous cults since 1995 and has banned wearing conspicuous religious symbols in schools since 2004. In 2010, it banned the wearing of face-covering Islamic veils in public; human rights groups such as Amnesty International and Human Rights Watch described the law as discriminatory towards Muslims. However, it is supported by most of the population.

Foreign relations

France is a founding member of the United Nations and serves as one of the permanent members of the UN Security Council with veto rights. In 2015, it was described as "the best networked state in the world" due to its membership in more international institutions than any other country; these include the G7, World Trade Organization (WTO), the Pacific Community (SPC) and the Indian Ocean Commission (COI). It is an associate member of the Association of Caribbean States (ACS) and a leading member of the Organisation internationale de la Francophonie (OIF) of 84 French-speaking countries.

As a significant hub for international relations, France has the third-largest assembly of diplomatic missions, second only to China and the United States, which are far more populous. It also hosts the headquarters of several international organisations, including the OECD, UNESCO, Interpol, the International Bureau of Weights and Measures, and the OIF.

Postwar French foreign policy has been largely shaped by membership in the European Union, of which it was a founding member. Since the 1960s, France has developed close ties with reunified Germany to become the most influential driving force of the EU. In the 1960s, France sought to exclude the British from the European unification process, seeking to build its standing in continental Europe. However, since 1904, France has maintained an "Entente cordiale" with the United Kingdom, and there has been a strengthening of links between the countries, especially militarily.

France is a member of the North Atlantic Treaty Organization (NATO), but under President de Gaulle excluded itself from the joint military command, in protest of the Special Relationship between the United States and Britain, and to preserve the independence of French foreign and security policies. Under Nicolas Sarkozy, France rejoined the NATO joint military command on 4 April 2009.

France retains strong political and economic influence in its former African colonies (Françafrique) and has supplied economic aid and troops for peacekeeping missions in Ivory Coast and Chad. From 2012 to 2021, France and other African states intervened in support of the Malian government in the Northern Mali conflict.

In 2017, France was the world's fourth-largest donor of development aid in absolute terms, behind the United States, Germany, and the United Kingdom. This represents 0.43% of its GNP, the 12th highest among the OECD. Aid is provided by the governmental French Development Agency, which finances primarily humanitarian projects in sub-Saharan Africa, with an emphasis on "developing infrastructure, access to health care and education, the implementation of appropriate economic policies and the consolidation of the rule of law and democracy".

Military

The French Armed Forces (Forces armées françaises) are the military and paramilitary forces of France, under the President of the Republic as supreme commander. They consist of the French Army (Armée de Terre), the French Navy (Marine Nationale, formerly called Armée de Mer), the French Air and Space Force (Armée de l'Air et de l’Espace), and the Military Police called National Gendarmerie (Gendarmerie nationale), which also fulfils civil police duties in the rural areas of France. Together they are among the largest armed forces in the world and the largest in the EU. According to a 2018 study by Crédit Suisse, the French Armed Forces are ranked as the world's sixth-most powerful military, and the second most powerful in Europe after Russia. France's annual military expenditure in 2018 was US$63.8 billion, or 2.3% of its GDP, making it the fifth biggest military spender in the world after the United States, China, Saudi Arabia, and India. There has been no national conscription since 1997.

France has been a recognised nuclear state since 1960. France has signed and ratified the Comprehensive Nuclear-Test-Ban Treaty (CTBT) and acceded to the Nuclear Non-Proliferation Treaty. The French nuclear force (formerly known as "Force de Frappe") consists of four Triomphant class submarines equipped with submarine-launched ballistic missiles. In addition to the submarine fleet, it is estimated that France has about 60 ASMP medium-range air-to-ground missiles with nuclear warheads, of which around 50 are deployed by the Air and Space Force using the Mirage 2000N long-range nuclear strike aircraft, while around 10 are deployed by the French Navy's Super Étendard Modernisé (SEM) attack aircraft, which operate from the nuclear-powered aircraft carrier Charles de Gaulle. The new Rafale F3 aircraft will gradually replace all Mirage 2000N and SEM in the nuclear strike role with the improved ASMP-A missile with a nuclear warhead.

France has major military industries with one of the largest aerospace industries in the world. Its industries have produced such equipment as the Rafale fighter, the Charles de Gaulle aircraft carrier, the Exocet missile and the Leclerc tank among others. France is actively investing in European joint projects such as the Eurocopter Tiger, multipurpose frigates, the UCAV demonstrator nEUROn and the Airbus A400M. France is a major arms seller, with most of its arsenal's designs available for the export market, except for the nuclear-powered devices.

One French intelligence unit, the Directorate-General for External Security (Direction générale de la sécurité extérieure), is considered to be a component of the Armed Forces under the authority of the Ministry of Defense. The other, the Central Directorate for Interior Intelligence (Direction centrale du renseignement intérieur) is a division of the National Police Force (Direction générale de la Police Nationale). France's cybersecurity capabilities are regularly ranked as some of the most robust of any nation in the world.

Government finance

The Government of France has run a budget deficit each year since the early 1970s. , French government debt levels reached 2.2 trillion euros, the equivalent of 96.4% of French GDP. In late 2012, credit rating agencies warned that growing French Government debt levels risked France's AAA credit rating, raising the possibility of a future downgrade and subsequent higher borrowing costs for the French authorities.
However, in July 2020, during the COVID-19 pandemic, the French government issued negative-interest rate 10-year bonds for the first time in its history. In 2020, France possessed the fourth-largest gold reserves in the world.

Economy

Overview 

France has a developed, high-income mixed economy, characterised by sizeable government involvement, economic diversity, a skilled labour force, and high innovation. For roughly two centuries, the French economy has consistently ranked among the ten largest globally; it is currently the world's ninth-largest by purchasing power parity, the seventh-largest by nominal GDP, and the second-largest in the European Union by both metrics. France is considered an economic power, with membership in the Group of Seven leading industrialised countries, the Organisation for Economic Co-operation and Development (OECD), and the Group of Twenty largest economies.

France's economy is highly diversified; services represent two-thirds of both the workforce and GDP, while the industrial sector accounts for a fifth of GDP and a similar proportion of employment. France is the third-biggest manufacturing country in Europe, behind Germany and Italy, and ranks eighth in the world by share of global manufacturing output, at 1.9 percent. Less than 2 percent of GDP is generated by the primary sector, namely agriculture; however, France's agricultural sector is among the largest in value and leads the EU in terms of overall production.

In 2018, France was the fifth-largest trading nation in the world and the second-largest in Europe, with the value of exports representing over a fifth of GDP. Its membership in the Eurozone and the broader European Single Market facilitates access to capital, goods, services, and skilled labour. Despite protectionist policies over certain industries, particularly in agriculture, France has generally played a leading role in fostering free trade and commercial integration in Europe to enhance its economy. In 2019, it ranked first in Europe and 13th in the world in foreign direct investment, with European countries and the United States being leading sources. According to the Bank of France, the leading recipients of FDI were manufacturing, real estate, finance and insurance. The Paris region has the highest concentration of multinational firms in Europe.

Under the doctrine of Dirigisme, the government historically played a major role in the economy; policies such as indicative planning and nationalisation are credited for contributing to three decades of unprecedented postwar economic growth known as Trente Glorieuses. At its peak in 1982, the public sector accounted for one-fifth of industrial employment and over four-fifths of the credit market. Beginning in the late 20th century, France loosened regulations and state involvement in the economy, with most leading companies now being privately owned; state ownership now dominates only transportation, defence and broadcasting. Policies aimed at promoting economic dynamism and privatisation have improved France's economic standing globally: it is among the world's 10 most innovative countries in the 2020 Bloomberg Innovation Index, and the 15th most competitive, according to the 2019 Global Competitiveness Report (up two places from 2018).

According to the IMF, France ranked 30th in GDP per capita, with roughly $45,000 per inhabitant. It placed 23rd on the Human Development Index, indicating very high human development. Public corruption is among the lowest in the world, with France consistently ranking among the 30 least corrupt countries since the Corruption Perceptions Index began in 2012; it placed 22nd in 2021, up one place from the previous year. France is Europe's second-largest spender in research and development, at over 2 percent of GDP; globally, it ranks 12th.

Financial services, banking, and insurance are important part of the economy. AXA is the world's second-largest insurance company by total nonbanking assets in 2020. As of 2011, the three largest financial institutions cooperatively owned by their customers were French: Crédit Agricole, Groupe Caisse D'Epargne, and Groupe Caisse D'Epargne. According to a 2020 report by S&P Global Market Intelligenc, France's leading banks, BNP Paribas and Crédit Agricole, are among the world's 10 largest bank by assets, with Société Générale and Groupe BPCE ranking 17th and 19th globally, respectively.

The Paris stock exchange is one of the oldest in the world, created by Louis XV in 1724. In 2000, it merged with counterparts in Amsterdam and Brussels to form Euronext, which in 2007 merged with the New York stock exchange to form NYSE Euronext, the world's largest stock exchange. Euronext Paris, the French branch of NYSE Euronext, is Europe's second-largest stock exchange market, behind the London Stock Exchange.

Agriculture 
France has historically been one of the world's major agricultural centres and remains a "global agricultural powerhouse". Nicknamed "the granary of the old continent", over half its total land area is farmland, of which 45 percent is devoted to permanent field crops such as cereals. The country's diverse climate, extensive arable land, modern farming technology, and EU subsidies have made it Europe's leading agricultural producer and exporter; it accounts for one-fifth of the EU's agricultural production, including over one-third of its oilseeds, cereals, and wine. As of 2017, France ranked first in Europe in beef and cereals; second in dairy and aquaculture; and third in poultry, fruits, vegetables, and manufactured chocolate products. France has the EU's largest cattle herd, at 18–19 million.

France is the world's sixth-biggest exporter of agricultural products, generating a trade surplus of over €7.4 billion. Its primary agricultural exports are wheat, poultry, dairy, beef, pork, and internationally recognised brands, particularly beverages. France is the fifth largest grower of wheat, after China, India, Russia, and the United States, all of which are significantly larger. It is the world's top exporter of natural spring water, flax, malt, and potatoes. In 2020, France exported over €61 billion in agricultural products, compared to €37 billion in 2000.

France was an early centre of viviculture, dating back to at least the sixth century BCE. It is the world's second-largest producer of wine, with many varieties enjoying global renown, such as Champagne and Bordeaux; domestic consumption is also high, particularly of Rosé. France produces rum primarily from overseas territories such as Martinique, Guadeloupe and La Réunion.

Relative to other developed countries, agriculture is an important sector of France's economy: 3.8% of the active population is employed in agriculture, whereas the total agri-food industry made up 4.2% of the French GDP in 2005. France remains the largest recipient of EU agricultural subsidies, receiving an annual average of €8 billion from 2007 to 2019.

Tourism

With 89 million international tourist arrivals in 2018, France is the world's top tourist destination, ahead of Spain (83 million) and the United States (80 million). However, it ranks third in tourism-derived income due to the shorter duration of visits. The most popular tourist sites include (annual visitors): Eiffel Tower (6.2 million), Château de Versailles (2.8 million), Muséum national d'Histoire naturelle (2 million), Pont du Gard (1.5 million), Arc de Triomphe (1.2 million), Mont Saint-Michel (1 million), Sainte-Chapelle (683,000), Château du Haut-Kœnigsbourg (549,000), Puy de Dôme (500,000), Musée Picasso (441,000), and Carcassonne (362,000).

France, especially Paris, has some of the world's largest and most renowned museums, including the Louvre, which is the most visited art museum in the world (5.7 million), the Musée d'Orsay (2.1 million), mostly devoted to Impressionism, the Musée de l'Orangerie (1.02 million), which is home to eight large Water Lily murals by Claude Monet, as well as the Centre Georges Pompidou (1.2 million), dedicated to contemporary art. Disneyland Paris is Europe's most popular theme park, with 15 million combined visitors to the resort's Disneyland Park and Walt Disney Studios Park in 2009.

With more than 10 million tourists a year, the French Riviera (French: Côte d'Azur), in Southeast France, is the second leading tourist destination in the country, after the Paris region. It benefits from 300 days of sunshine per year,  of coastline and beaches, 18 golf courses, 14 ski resorts and 3,000 restaurants. Each year the Côte d'Azur hosts 50% of the world's superyacht fleet.

With 6 million tourists a year, the castles of the Loire Valley (French: châteaux) and the Loire Valley itself are the third leading tourist destination in France; this World Heritage Site is noteworthy for its architectural heritage, in its historic towns but in particular its castles, such as the Châteaux d'Amboise, de Chambord, d'Ussé, de Villandry, Chenonceau and Montsoreau. The Château de Chantilly, Versailles and Vaux-le-Vicomte, all three located near Paris, are also visitor attractions.

France has 37 sites inscribed in UNESCO's World Heritage List and features cities of high cultural interest, beaches and seaside resorts, ski resorts, as well as rural regions that many enjoy for their beauty and tranquillity (green tourism). Small and picturesque French villages are promoted through the association Les Plus Beaux Villages de France (literally "The Most Beautiful Villages of France"). The "Remarkable Gardens" label is a list of the over 200 gardens classified by the Ministry of Culture. This label is intended to protect and promote remarkable gardens and parks. France attracts many religious pilgrims on their way to St. James, or to Lourdes, a town in the Hautes-Pyrénées that hosts several million visitors a year.

Energy

France is the world's tenth-largest producer of electricity. Électricité de France (EDF), which is majority-owned by the French government, is the country's main producer and distributor of electricity, and one of the world's largest electric utility companies, ranking third in revenue globally. In 2018, EDF produced around one-fifth of the European Union's electricity, primarily from nuclear power. As of 2021, France was the biggest energy exporter in Europe, mostly to the U.K. and Italy, and the largest net exporter of electricity in the world.

Since the 1973 oil crisis, France has pursued a strong policy of energy security, namely through heavy investment in nuclear energy. It is one of 32 countries with nuclear power plants, ranking second in the world by the number of operational nuclear reactors, at 56. Consequently, 70% of France's electricity is generated by nuclear power, the highest proportion in the world by a wide margin; only Slovakia and Ukraine derive a majority of electricity from nuclear power, at roughly 53% and 51%, respectively. France is considered a world leader in nuclear technology, with reactors and fuel products being major exports.

Due to its overwhelming reliance on nuclear power, renewable energies have seen relatively little growth compared to other Western countries. Nevertheless, between 2008 and 2019, France's production capacity from renewable energies rose consistently and nearly doubled. Hydropower is by far the leading source, accounting for over half the country's renewable energy sources and contributing 13% of its electricity, the highest proportion in Europe after Norway and Turkey. As with nuclear power, most hydroelectric plants, such as Eguzon, Étang de Soulcem, and Lac de Vouglans, are managed by EDF. France aims to further expand hydropower into 2040.

France made minimal but measurable investments in other renewable energy sources. Due to its geography and extensive agricultural land, it has the second-largest wind energy potential in Europe, and by 2017 had ranked eighth globally in installed wind capacity. In terms of solar power, France ranked seventh in the world in 2015 for solar photovoltaic installation capacity. As of 2019, solar power sources generated over 10,570 megawatts of electricity, compared to a little over 1,000 megawatts in 2010.

Because France derives the vast majority of its power from nuclear and renewable sources, close to half its primary energy (48.5%) is derived from low-carbon sources, compared to 26.4% in Europe and 15.7% in the world as a whole. France is also the smallest emitter of carbon dioxide among the G7.

Transport

France's railway network, which stretches  as of 2008, is the second most extensive in Western Europe after Germany. The Eurostar, along with the Eurotunnel Shuttle, connects with the United Kingdom through the Channel Tunnel. Rail connections exist to all other neighbouring countries in Europe except Andorra. Intra-urban connections are also well developed, with most major cities having underground or tramway services complementing bus services.

The Paris region is enveloped with the densest network of roads and highways, which connect it with virtually all parts of the country. French roads also handle substantial international traffic, connecting with cities in neighbouring Belgium, Luxembourg, Germany, Switzerland, Italy, Spain, Andorra and Monaco. There is no annual registration fee or road tax; however, usage of the mostly privately owned motorways is through tolls except in the vicinity of large communes. The new car market is dominated by domestic brands such as Renault, Peugeot and Citroën. France possesses the Millau Viaduct, the world's tallest bridge, and has built many important bridges such as the Pont de Normandie. Diesel and gasoline-fuelled cars and lorries cause a large part of the country's air pollution and greenhouse gas emissions.

There are 464 airports in France. Charles de Gaulle Airport, located in the vicinity of Paris, is the largest and busiest airport in the country, handling the vast majority of popular and commercial traffic and connecting Paris with virtually all major cities across the world. Air France is the national carrier airline, although numerous private airline companies provide domestic and international travel services. There are ten major ports in France, the largest of which is in Marseille, which also is the largest bordering the Mediterranean Sea. of waterways traverse France including the Canal du Midi, which connects the Mediterranean Sea to the Atlantic Ocean through the Garonne river.

Science and technology

Since the Middle Ages, France has been a major contributor to scientific and technological achievement. In the early 11th century, the French-born Pope Sylvester II reintroduced the abacus and armillary sphere and introduced Arabic numerals and clocks to much of Europe. The University of Paris, founded in the mid-12th century, is still one of the most important academic institutions in the Western world. In the 17th century, mathematician René Descartes pioneered rationalism as a method for acquiring scientific knowledge, while Blaise Pascal became famous for his work on probability and fluid mechanics; both were key figures of the Scientific Revolution, which blossomed in Europe during this period. The French Academy of Sciences, founded in the mid-17th century by Louis XIV to encourage and protect French scientific research, was one of the earliest national scientific institutions in history; it was at the forefront of scientific developments in Europe for the next two centuries.

The Age of Enlightenment was marked by the work of biologist Buffon, one of the first naturalists to recognise ecological succession, and chemist Lavoisier, who discovered the role of oxygen in combustion. Diderot and D'Alembert published the Encyclopédie, which aimed to give the public access to "useful knowledge" that could be applied to everyday life. The Industrial Revolution of the 19th century saw spectacular scientific developments in France, with Augustin Fresnel founding modern optics, Sadi Carnot laying the foundations of thermodynamics, and Louis Pasteur pioneering microbiology. Other eminent French scientists of the period have their names inscribed on the Eiffel Tower.

Famous French scientists of the 20th century include the mathematician and physicist Henri Poincaré; physicists Henri Becquerel, Pierre and Marie Curie, who remain famous for their work on radioactivity; physicist Paul Langevin; and virologist Luc Montagnier, co-discoverer of HIV AIDS. Hand transplantation was developed in Lyon in 1998 by an international team that included Jean-Michel Dubernard, who afterward performed the first successful double hand transplant. Telesurgery was first performed by French surgeons led by Jacques Marescaux on 7 September 2001 across the Atlantic Ocean. A face transplant was first done on 27 November 2005 by Dr Bernard Devauchelle.

France was the fourth country to achieve nuclear capability and has the third largest nuclear weapons arsenal in the world; it is also a leader in civilian nuclear technology. France was the third nation, after the Soviet Union and the United States, to launch its space satellite and the first to establish a commercial launch service provider, Arianespace. The French national space programme, CNES, is the third oldest in the world, and the oldest, largest, and most active in Europe. France is a founding member of the European Space Agency (ESA), contributing over a quarter of its budget, the most of any member state. ESA is headquartered in Paris, has its principal spaceport in French Guiana, and utilises the French-made Ariane 5 as its primary launch vehicle. Airbus, a leading aerospace company and the world's largest airline manufacturer, was formed partly from the French company, Aérospatiale; its main commercial airline business is conducted through its French division, Airbus S.A.S.

France also hosts major international research facilities, including the European Synchrotron Radiation Facility, the Institut Laue–Langevin, and Minatec, Europe's leading nanotechnology research centre. It is also a major member of CERN, which operates the largest particle physics laboratory in the world and is its third largest contributor. France pioneered and hosts ITER, an international effort to develop nuclear fusion energy, which is the world's biggest megaproject.

As of 2021, it is the third-fastest train in the world, surpassed only by maglev models that utilise magnetic levitation. Western Europe is now serviced by a network of TGV lines.

The Centre National de la Recherche Scientifique (CNRS), the state research agency, is the largest research institute in Europe and among the most prominent internationally; according to the 2020 Nature Index, it ranks fourth in the share of articles published in scientific journals worldwide, with France as a whole having the sixth-highest share.

As of 2022, France ranks fourth in the number of Nobel laureates, with 70 French people having been awarded a Nobel Prize. Twelve French mathematicians have received a Fields Medal, considered the most prestigious award in the field, making up one-fifth of total recipients, and second only to the United States.

France ranked 12th in the 2022 Global Innovation Index, compared to 12th in 2020 and 16th in 2019.

Demographics

With an estimated January 2023 population of 68,042,591 people, France is the 20th most populous country in the world, the third-most populous in Europe (after Russia and Germany), and the second most populous in the European Union (after Germany).

France is an outlier among developed countries, particularly in Europe, for its relatively high rate of natural population growth: By birth rates alone, it was responsible for almost all natural population growth in the European Union in 2006. Between 2006 and 2016, France saw the second-highest overall increase in population in the EU and was one of only four EU countries where natural births accounted for the most population growth. This was the highest rate since the end of the baby boom in 1973 and coincides with the rise of the total fertility rate from a nadir of 1.7 in 1994 to 2.0 in 2010.

, the fertility rate declined slightly to 1.84 children per woman, below the replacement rate of 2.1, and considerably below the high of 4.41 in 1800. France's fertility rate and crude birth rate nonetheless remain among the highest in the EU. However, like many developed nations, the French population is aging; the average age is 41.7 years, while about a fifth of French people is 65 or over. The average life expectancy at birth is 82.7 years, the 12th highest in the world.

From 2006 to 2011, population growth averaged 0.6 percent per year; since 2011, annual growth has been between 0.4 and 0.5 percent annually. Immigrants are major contributors to this trend; in 2010, 27 percent of newborns in metropolitan France had at least one foreign-born parent and another 24 percent had at least one parent born outside Europe (excluding French overseas territories).

Ethnic groups

Historically, French people were mainly of Celtic-Gallic origin, with a significant admixture of Italic (Romans) and Germanic (Franks) groups reflecting centuries of respective migration and settlement. Through the course of the Middle Ages, France incorporated various neighbouring ethnic and linguistic groups, as evidenced by Breton elements in the west, Aquitanian in the southwest, Scandinavian in the northwest, Alemannic in the northeast, and Ligurian in the southeast.

Large-scale immigration over the last century and a half have led to a more multicultural society; beginning with the French Revolution, and further codified in the French Constitution of 1958, the government is prohibited from collecting data on ethnicity and ancestry; most demographic information is drawn from private sector organisations or academic institutions. In 2004, the Institut Montaigne estimated that within Metropolitan France, 51 million people were White (85% of the population), 6 million were Northwest African (10%), 2 million were Black (3.3%), and 1 million were Asian (1.7%).

A 2008 poll conducted jointly by INED and the French National Institute of Statistics estimated that the largest ancestry groups were Italian (5 million), followed by Northwest African (3–6 million), Sub-Saharan African (2.5 million), Armenian (500,000), and Turkish (200,000). There are also sizeable minorities of other European ethnic groups, namely Spanish, Portuguese, Polish, and Greek. France has a significant Gitan (Romani) population, numbering between 20,000 and 400,000; many foreign Roma are expelled back to Bulgaria and Romania frequently.

Immigration 
It is currently estimated that 40% of the French population is descended at least partially from the different waves of immigration since the early 20th century; between 1921 and 1935 alone, about 1.1 million net immigrants came to France. The next largest wave came in the 1960s when around 1.6 million pieds noirs returned to France following the independence of its Northwest African possessions, Algeria and Morocco. They were joined by numerous former colonial subjects from North and West Africa, as well as numerous European immigrants from Spain and Portugal.

France remains a major destination for immigrants, accepting about 200,000 legal immigrants annually. In 2005, it was Western Europe's leading recipient of asylum seekers, with an estimated 50,000 applications (albeit a 15% decrease from 2004). In 2010, France received about 48,100 asylum applications—placing it among the top five asylum recipients in the world and in subsequent years it saw the number of applications increase, ultimately doubling to 100,412 in 2017. The European Union allows free movement between the member states, although France established controls to curb Eastern European migration, and immigration remains a contentious political issue.

In 2008, the INSEE (National Institute of Statistics and Economic Studies) estimated that the total number of foreign-born immigrants was around 5 million (8% of the population), while their French-born descendants numbered 6.5 million, or 11% of the population. Thus, nearly a fifth of the country's population were either first or second-generation immigrants, of which more than 5 million were of European origin and 4 million of Maghrebi ancestry. In 2008, France granted citizenship to 137,000 persons, mostly from Morocco, Algeria and Turkey.

In 2014, the INSEE reported a significant increase in the number of immigrants coming from Spain, Portugal and Italy between 2009 and 2012. According to the French Institute, this increase resulted from the financial crisis that hit several European countries in that period. Statistics on Spanish immigrants in France show a growth of 107 percent between 2009 and 2012, with the population growing from 5,300 to 11,000. Of the total of 229,000 foreigners who were in France in 2012, nearly 8% were Portuguese, 5% British, 5% Spanish, 4% Italian, 4% German, 3% Romanian, and 3% Belgian.

Major cities

France is a highly urbanised country, with its largest cities (in terms of metropolitan area population in 2019) being Paris (13,114,718 inh.), Lyon (2,280,845), Marseille (1,873,270), Lille (1,510,079), Toulouse (1,454,158), Bordeaux (1,363,711), Nantes (1,011,020), Strasbourg (853,110), Montpellier (801,595), and Rennes (755,668). (Note: since its 2020 revision of metropolitan area borders, INSEE considers that Nice is a metropolitan area separate from the Cannes-Antibes metropolitan area; these two combined would have a population of 1,008,296, as of the 2019 census). Rural flight was a perennial political issue throughout most of the 20th century.

Language

The official language of France is French, a Romance language derived from Latin. Since 1635, the Académie française has been France's official authority on the French language, although its recommendations carry no legal weight. There are also regional languages spoken in France, such as Occitan, Breton, Catalan, Flemish (Dutch dialect), Alsatian (German dialect), Basque, and Corsican (Italian dialect). Italian was the official language of Corsica until 9 May 1859.

The Government of France does not regulate the choice of language in publications by individuals, but the use of French is required by law in commercial and workplace communications. In addition to mandating the use of French in the territory of the Republic, the French government tries to promote French in the European Union and globally through institutions such as the Organisation internationale de la Francophonie. The perceived threat from anglicisation has prompted efforts to safeguard the position of the French language in France. Besides French, there exist 77 vernacular minority languages of France, eight spoken in French metropolitan territory and 69 in the French overseas territories.

From the 17th to the mid-20th century, French served as the pre-eminent international language of diplomacy and international affairs as well as a lingua franca among the educated classes of Europe. The dominant position of the French language in international affairs was overtaken by English since the emergence of the United States as a major power.

For most of the time in which French served as an international lingua franca, it was not the native language of most Frenchmen: a report in 1794 conducted by Henri Grégoire found that of the country's 25 million people, only three million spoke French natively; the rest spoke one of the country's many regional languages, such as Alsatian, Breton or Occitan. Through the expansion of public education, in which French was the sole language of instruction, as well as other factors such as increased urbanisation and the rise of mass communication, French gradually came to be adopted by virtually the entire population, a process not completed until the 20th century.

As a result of France's extensive colonial ambitions between the 17th and 20th centuries, French was introduced to the Americas, Africa, Polynesia, South-East Asia, as well as the Caribbean. French is the second most studied foreign language in the world after English, and is a lingua franca in some regions, notably in Africa. The legacy of French as a living language outside Europe is mixed: it is nearly extinct in some former French colonies (The Levant, South and Southeast Asia), while creoles and pidgins based on French have emerged in the French departments in the West Indies and the South Pacific (French Polynesia). On the other hand, many former French colonies have adopted French as an official language, and the total number of French speakers is increasing, especially in Africa.

It is estimated that between 300 million and 500 million people worldwide can speak French, either as a mother tongue or as a second language.

According to the 2007 Adult Education survey, part of a project by the European Union and carried out in France by the INSEE and based on a sample of 15,350 persons, French was the native language of 87.2% of the total population, or roughly 55.81 million people, followed by Arabic (3.6%, 2.3 million), Portuguese (1.5%, 960,000), Spanish (1.2%, 770,000) and Italian (1.0%, 640,000). Native speakers of other languages made up the remaining 5.2% of the population.

Religion

France is a secular country in which freedom of religion is a constitutional right. French religious policy is based on the concept of laïcité, a strict separation of church and state under which public life is kept completely secular. The exception to this is the region of Alsace and Moselle where Lutheranism, Catholicism and Judaism enjoy official status and state funding.

According to a survey held in 2016 by Institut Montaigne and Institut français d'opinion publique (IFOP), 51.1% of the total population of France was Christian, 39.6% had no religion (atheism or agnosticism), 5.6% were Muslims, 2.5% were followers of other faiths, and the remaining 0.4% were undecided about their faith. Estimates of the number of Muslims in France vary widely. In 2003, the French Ministry of the Interior estimated the total number of people of Muslim background to be between 5 and 6 million (8–10%). The current Jewish community in France is the largest in Europe and the third largest in the world after Israel and the United States, ranging between 480,000 and 600,000, about 0.8% of the population as of 2016.

Catholicism has been the predominant religion in France for more than a millennium, though it is not as actively practised today as it was. Among the 47,000 religious buildings in France, 94% are Roman Catholic. During the French Revolution, activists conducted a brutal campaign of de-Christianisation, ending the Catholic Church as the state religion. In some cases, clergy and churches were attacked, with iconoclasm stripping the churches of statues and ornaments. After alternating between royal and secular republican governments during the 19th century, in 1905 France passed the 1905 law on the Separation of the Churches and the State, which established the principle of laïcité.

To this day, the government is prohibited from recognising any specific right to a religious community (except for legacy statutes like those of military chaplains and the local law in Alsace-Moselle). It recognises religious organisations according to formal legal criteria that do not address religious doctrine. Conversely, religious organisations are expected to refrain from intervening in policymaking.

Certain groups, such as Scientology, Children of God, the Unification Church, or the Order of the Solar Temple are considered cults ("sectes" in French); therefore they do not have the same status as recognised religions in France. Secte is considered a pejorative term in France.

Health

The French health care system is one of universal health care largely financed by government national health insurance. In its 2000 assessment of world health care systems, the World Health Organization found that France provided the "close to best overall health care" in the world. The French health care system was ranked first worldwide by the World Health Organization in 1997. In 2011, France spent 11.6% of its GDP on health care, or US$4,086 per capita, a figure much higher than the average spent by countries in Europe but less than in the United States. Approximately 77% of health expenditures are covered by government-funded agencies.

Care is generally free for people affected by chronic diseases (affections de longues durées) such as cancer, AIDS or cystic fibrosis. Average life expectancy at birth is 78 years for men and 85 years for women, one of the highest in the European Union and the World. There are 3.22 physicians for every 1000 inhabitants in France, and average health care spending per capita was US$4,719 in 2008.
, approximately 140,000 inhabitants (0.4%) of France are living with HIV/AIDS.

Even if the French have the reputation of being one of the thinnest people in developed countries, France—like other rich countries—faces an increasing and recent epidemic of obesity, due mostly to the replacement in French eating habits of traditional healthy French cuisine by junk food. The French obesity rate is still far below that of the United States—currently equal to the American rate in the 1970s—and is still the lowest in Europe. Authorities now regard obesity as one of the main public health issues and fight it fiercely. Rates of childhood obesity are slowing in France while continuing to grow in other countries.

Education

In 1802, Napoleon created the lycée, the second and final stage of secondary education that prepares students for higher education studies or a profession. Nevertheless, Jules Ferry is considered the father of the French modern school, leading reforms in the late 19th century that established free, secular and compulsory education (currently mandatory until the age of 16).

French education is centralised and divided into three stages: Primary, secondary, and higher education. The Programme for International Student Assessment, coordinated by the OECD, ranked France's education as near the OECD average in 2018. France was one of the PISA-participating countries where school children perceived some of the lowest levels of support and feedback from their teachers. Schoolchildren in France reported greater concern about the disciplinary climate and behaviour in classrooms compared to other OECD countries.

Primary and secondary education are predominantly public, and run by the Ministry of National Education. While training and remuneration of teachers and the curriculum are the responsibility of the state centrally, the management of primary and secondary schools is overseen by local authorities. Primary education comprises two phases, nursery school (école maternelle) and elementary school (école élémentaire). Nursery school aims to stimulate the minds of very young children and promote their socialisation and development of a basic grasp of language and numbers. Around the age of six, children transfer to elementary school, whose primary objectives are learning about writing, arithmetic and citizenship. Secondary education also consists of two phases. The first is delivered through colleges (collège) and leads to the national certificate (Diplôme national du brevet). The second is offered in high schools (lycée) and finishes in national exams leading to a baccalaureate (baccalauréat, available in professional, technical or general flavours) or certificate of professional competence (certificat d'aptitude professionelle).

Higher education is divided between public universities and the prestigious and selective Grandes écoles, such as Sciences Po Paris for Political studies, HEC Paris for Economics, Polytechnique, the École des hautes études en sciences sociales for Social studies and the École nationale supérieure des mines de Paris that produce high-profile engineers, or the École nationale d'administration for careers in the Grands Corps of the state. The Grandes écoles have been criticised for alleged elitism, producing many if not most of France's high-ranking civil servants, CEOs and politicians.

Culture

The creation of the Ministry of Culture in 1959 helped preserve the cultural heritage of the country and make it available to the public by granting subsidies to artists, promoting French culture in the world, supporting festivals and cultural events, and protecting historical monuments. The French government also succeeded in maintaining a cultural exception to defend audiovisual products made in the country.

France has 1,200 museums, visited by more than 50 million people annually. The most important cultural sites are run by the government, for instance through the public agency Centre des monuments nationaux, which is responsible for approximately 85 historical monuments. The 43,180 buildings protected as historical monuments include mainly residences (many castles) and religious buildings (cathedrals, basilicas, churches), but also statues, memorials and gardens. UNESCO inscribed 45 sites in France on the World Heritage List.

Art

The origins of French art were very much influenced by Flemish art and by Italian art at the time of the Renaissance. Jean Fouquet, the most famous medieval French painter, is said to have been the first to travel to Italy and experience the Early Renaissance firsthand. The Renaissance painting School of Fontainebleau was directly inspired by Italian painters such as Primaticcio and Rosso Fiorentino, who both worked in France. Two of the most famous French artists of the time of the Baroque era, Nicolas Poussin and Claude Lorrain, lived in Italy. The 17th century was the period when French painting became prominent and individualised itself through classicism. Prime Minister Jean-Baptiste Colbert founded the Royal Academy of Painting and Sculpture in 1648 under Louis XIV to protect these artists; in 1666 he also created the still-active French Academy in Rome to have direct relations with Italian artists.

French artists developed the rococo style in the 18th century, as a more intimate imitation of the old baroque style, the works of the court-endorsed artists Antoine Watteau, François Boucher and Jean-Honoré Fragonard being the most representative in the country. The French Revolution brought great changes, as Napoleon favoured artists of neoclassic style such as Jacques-Louis David and the highly influential Académie des Beaux-Arts defined the style known as Academism. At this time France had become a centre of artistic creation, the first half of the 19th century being dominated by two successive movements, at first Romanticism with Théodore Géricault and Eugène Delacroix, then Realism with Camille Corot, Gustave Courbet and Jean-François Millet, a style that eventually evolved into Naturalism.

In the second part of the 19th century, France's influence over painting grew, with the development of new styles of painting such as Impressionism and Symbolism. The most famous impressionist painters of the period were Camille Pissarro, Édouard Manet, Edgar Degas, Claude Monet and Auguste Renoir. The second generation of impressionist-style painters, Paul Cézanne, Paul Gauguin, Toulouse-Lautrec and Georges Seurat, were also at the avant-garde of artistic evolutions, as well as the fauvist artists Henri Matisse, André Derain and Maurice de Vlaminck.

At the beginning of the 20th century, Cubism was developed by Georges Braque and the Spanish painter Pablo Picasso, living in Paris. Other foreign artists also settled and worked in or near Paris, such as Vincent van Gogh, Marc Chagall, Amedeo Modigliani and Wassily Kandinsky.

There are many art museums in France, the most famous of which being the state-owned Musée du Louvre, which collects artwork from the 18th century and earlier. The Musée d'Orsay was inaugurated in 1986 in the old railway station Gare d'Orsay, in a major reorganisation of national art collections, to gather French paintings from the second part of the 19th century (mainly Impressionism and Fauvism movements). It was voted the best museum in the world in 2018.  Modern works are presented in the Musée National d'Art Moderne, which moved in 1976 to the Centre Georges Pompidou. These three state-owned museums are visited by close to 17 million people a year.

Other national museums hosting paintings include the Grand Palais (1.3 million visitors in 2008), but there are also many museums owned by cities, the most visited being the Musée d'Art Moderne de la Ville de Paris (0.8 million entries in 2008), which hosts contemporary works. Outside Paris, all the large cities have a Museum of Fine Arts with a section dedicated to European and French painting. Some of the finest collections are in Lyon, Lille, Rouen, Dijon, Rennes and Grenoble.

Architecture

During the Middle Ages, many fortified castles were built by feudal nobles to mark their powers. Some French castles that survived are Chinon, Château d'Angers, the massive Château de Vincennes and the so-called Cathar castles. During this era, France had been using Romanesque architecture like most of Western Europe. Some of the greatest examples of Romanesque churches in France are the Saint Sernin Basilica in Toulouse, the largest Romanesque church in Europe, and the remains of the Cluny Abbey.

Gothic architecture, originally named Opus Francigenum meaning "French work", was born in Île-de-France and was the first French style of architecture to be copied in all of Europe. Northern France is the home of some of the most important Gothic cathedrals and basilicas, the first of these being the Saint Denis Basilica (used as the royal necropolis); other important French Gothic cathedrals are Notre-Dame de Chartres and Notre-Dame d'Amiens. The kings were crowned in another important Gothic church: Notre-Dame de Reims. Aside from churches, Gothic Architecture had been used for many religious palaces, the most important one being the Palais des Papes in Avignon.

The final victory in the Hundred Years' War marked an important stage in the evolution of French architecture. It was the time of the French Renaissance and several artists from Italy were invited to the French court; many residential palaces were built in the Loire Valley, from 1450 as a first reference the Château de Montsoreau. Such residential castles were the Château de Chambord, the Château de Chenonceau, or the Château d'Amboise.

Following the renaissance and the end of the Middle Ages, Baroque architecture replaced the traditional Gothic style. However, in France, baroque architecture found greater success in the secular domain than in the religious one. In the secular domain, the Palace of Versailles has many baroque features. Jules Hardouin Mansart, who designed the extensions to Versailles, was one of the most influential French architects of the baroque era; he is famous for his dome at Les Invalides. Some of the most impressive provincial baroque architecture is found in places that were not yet French such as Place Stanislas in Nancy. On the military architectural side, Vauban designed some of the most efficient fortresses in Europe and became an influential military architect; as a result, imitations of his works can be found all over Europe, the Americas, Russia and Turkey.

After the Revolution, the Republicans favoured Neoclassicism although it was introduced in France before the revolution with such buildings as the Parisian Pantheon or the Capitole de Toulouse. Built during the first French Empire, the Arc de Triomphe and Sainte Marie-Madeleine represent the best example of Empire-style architecture.

Under Napoleon III, a new wave of urbanism and architecture was given birth; extravagant buildings such as the neo-baroque Palais Garnier were built. The urban planning of the time was very organised and rigorous; most notably, Haussmann's renovation of Paris. The architecture associated with this era is named Second Empire in English, the term being taken from the Second French Empire. At this time there was a strong Gothic resurgence across Europe and in France; the associated architect was Eugène Viollet-le-Duc. In the late 19th century, Gustave Eiffel designed many bridges, such as the Garabit viaduct, and remains one of the most influential bridge designers of his time, although he is best remembered for the iconic Eiffel Tower.

In the 20th century, French-Swiss architect Le Corbusier designed several buildings in France. More recently, French architects have combined both modern and old architectural styles. The Louvre Pyramid is an example of modern architecture added to an older building. The most difficult buildings to integrate within French cities are skyscrapers, as they are visible from afar. For instance, in Paris, since 1977, new buildings had to be under . France's largest financial district is La Défense, where a significant number of skyscrapers are located. Other massive buildings that are a challenge to integrate into their environment are large bridges; an example of the way this has been done is the Millau Viaduct. Some famous modern French architects include Jean Nouvel, Dominique Perrault, Christian de Portzamparc and Paul Andreu.

Literature

The earliest French literature dates from the Middle Ages when what is now known as modern France did not have a single, uniform language. There were several languages and dialects, and writers used their own spelling and grammar. Some authors of French medieval texts, such as Tristan and Iseult and Lancelot-Grail are unknown. Three famous medieval authors are Chrétien de Troyes, Christine de Pizan (langue d'oïl), and Duke William IX of Aquitaine (langue d'oc). Much medieval French poetry and literature was inspired by the legends of the Carolingian cycle, such as The Song of Roland and the various chansons de geste. The Roman de Renart, written in 1175 by Perrout de Saint Cloude, tells the story of the medieval character Reynard ('the Fox') and is another example of early French writing.

An important 16th-century writer was François Rabelais, who wrote five popular early picaresque novels. Rabelais was also in regular communication with Marguerite de Navarre, author of the Heptameron. Another 16th-century author was Michel de Montaigne, whose most famous work, Essais, started a literary genre.  Pierre de Ronsard and Joachim du Bellay, were the founders of the La Pléiade poetic movement.

In 1678, Madame de La Fayette anonymously published La Princesse de Clèves, a widely praised psychological novel. Jean de La Fontaine is a famous 17th century fabulist, who borrowed from Aesop. Generations of French schoolchildren had to learn his fables by heart, as they were thought to teach wisdom and common sense. Some of his verses have entered the popular language to become proverbs.

Jean Racine, who wrote plays such as Phèdre or Britannicus using alexandrines, is considered one of the three great dramatists of France's golden age along with Pierre Corneille (Le Cid) and Molière, who wrote dozens of plays, including Le Misanthrope, L'Avare, Le Malade imaginaire, and Le Bourgeois gentilhomme. French is sometimes referred to as "the language of Molière".

French literature and poetry flourished during the 18th and 19th centuries. Denis Diderot's best-known works are Jacques the Fatalist and Rameau's Nephew. He is best known, however, as the main editor of the Encyclopédie, whose aim was, to sum up all the knowledge of his century (in fields such as arts, sciences, languages, and philosophy) and to fight ignorance and obscurantism. During that same century, Charles Perrault was a prolific writer of children's fairy tales including Puss in Boots, Cinderella, Sleeping Beauty and Bluebeard. At the start of the 19th century, symbolist poetry was an important movement in French literature, with poets such as Charles Baudelaire, Paul Verlaine and Stéphane Mallarmé.

The 19th century saw the writings of many renowned French authors. Victor Hugo is sometimes seen as "the greatest French writer of all time" for excelling in all literary genres. The preface of his play Cromwell is considered to be the manifesto of the Romantic movement. Les Contemplations and La Légende des siècles are considered "poetic masterpieces", Hugo's verse has been compared to that of Shakespeare, Dante and Homer. His novel Les Misérables is widely seen as one of the greatest novels ever written and The Hunchback of Notre Dame has remained immensely popular. Other major authors of that century include Alexandre Dumas (The Three Musketeers and The Count of Monte-Cristo), Jules Verne (Twenty Thousand Leagues Under the Sea), Émile Zola (Les Rougon-Macquart), Honoré de Balzac (La Comédie humaine), Guy de Maupassant, Théophile Gautier and Stendhal (The Red and the Black, The Charterhouse of Parma), whose works are among the most well known in France and the world.

The Prix Goncourt is a French literary prize first awarded in 1903.

In the early 20th century France was a haven for literary freedom. Works banned for obscenity in the US, the UK and other Anglophone nations were published in France decades before they were available in the respective authors' home countries. The innate French regard for the mind meant that France was disinclined to punish literary figures for their writing, and prosecutions were rare. Important writers of the 20th century include Marcel Proust, Louis-Ferdinand Céline, Albert Camus, and Jean-Paul Sartre. Antoine de Saint Exupéry wrote Little Prince, which has remained popular for decades. , French authors had more Literature Nobel Prizes than those of any other nation. The first Nobel Prize in Literature was for a French author, while France's latest Nobel prize in literature was for Patrick Modiano, who was awarded the prize in 2014. Jean-Paul Sartre was also the first nominee in the committee's history to refuse the prize in 1964.

Philosophy

Medieval philosophy was dominated by Scholasticism until the emergence of Humanism in the Renaissance. Modern philosophy began in France in the 17th century with the philosophy of René Descartes, Blaise Pascal and Nicolas Malebranche. Descartes was the first Western philosopher since ancient times to attempt to build a philosophical system from the ground up rather than building on the work of predecessors. His Meditations on First Philosophy changed the primary object of philosophical thought and raised some of the most fundamental problems for foreigners such as Spinoza, Leibniz, Hume, Berkeley, and Kant.

French philosophers produced some of the most important political works of the Age of Enlightenment. In The Spirit of the Laws, Baron de Montesquieu theorised the principle of separation of powers, which has been implemented in all liberal democracies since it was first applied in the United States. Voltaire came to embody the Enlightenment with his defence of civil liberties, such as the right to a free trial and freedom of religion.

19th-century French thought was targeted at responding to the social malaise following the French Revolution. Rationalist philosophers such as Victor Cousin and Auguste Comte, who called for a new social doctrine, were opposed by reactionary thinkers such as Joseph de Maistre, Louis de Bonald and Félicité Robert de Lamennais, who blamed the rationalist rejection of traditional order. De Maistre, together with the Englishman Edmund Burke, was one of the founders of European conservatism. Comte was the founder of positivism, which Émile Durkheim reformulated as a basis for social research.

In the 20th century, partly as a reaction to the perceived excesses of positivism, French spiritualism thrived with thinkers such as Henri Bergson and it influenced American pragmatism and Whitehead's version of process philosophy. Meanwhile, French epistemology became a prominent school of thought with Jules Henri Poincaré, Gaston Bachelard, Jean Cavaillès and Jules Vuillemin. Influenced by German phenomenology and existentialism, the philosophy of Jean-Paul Sartre gained a strong influence after World War II, and late-20th-century-France became the cradle of postmodern philosophy with Jean-François Lyotard, Jean Baudrillard, Jacques Derrida and Michel Foucault.

Music

France has a long and varied musical history. It experienced a golden age in the 17th century thanks to Louis XIV, who employed many talented musicians and composers in the royal court. The most renowned composers of this period include Marc-Antoine Charpentier, François Couperin, Michel-Richard Delalande, Jean-Baptiste Lully and Marin Marais, all of them composers at the court. After the death of the "Roi Soleil", French musical creation lost dynamism, but in the next century the music of Jean-Philippe Rameau reached some prestige, and today he is still one of the most renowned French composers. Rameau became the dominant composer of French opera and the leading French composer of the harpsichord.

French composers played an important role in the music of the 19th and early 20th centuries, which is considered to be the Romantic music era. Romantic music emphasised a surrender to nature, a fascination with the past and the supernatural, the exploration of unusual, strange and surprising sounds, and a focus on national identity. This period was also a golden age for operas. French composers from the Romantic era included: Hector Berlioz (best known for his Symphonie fantastique), Georges Bizet (best known for Carmen, which has become one of the most popular and frequently performed operas), Gabriel Fauré (best known for his Pavane, Requiem, and nocturnes), Charles Gounod (best known for his Ave Maria and his opera Faust), Jacques Offenbach (best known for his 100 operettas of the 1850s–1870s and his uncompleted opera The Tales of Hoffmann), Édouard Lalo (best known for his Symphonie espagnole for violin and orchestra and his Cello Concerto in D minor), Jules Massenet (best known for his operas, of which he wrote more than thirty, the most frequently staged are Manon (1884) and Werther (1892)) and Camille Saint-Saëns (he has many frequently-performed works, including The Carnival of the Animals, Danse macabre, Samson and Delilah (Opera), Introduction and Rondo Capriccioso and his Symphony No. 3).

Later came precursors of modern classical music. Érik Satie was a key member of the early-20th-century Parisian avant-garde, best known for his Gymnopédies. Francis Poulenc's best-known works are his piano suite Trois mouvements perpétuels (1919), the ballet Les biches (1923), the Concert champêtre (1928) for harpsichord and orchestra, the opera Dialogues des Carmélites (1957) and the Gloria (1959) for soprano, choir and orchestra. Maurice Ravel and Claude Debussy are the most prominent figures associated with Impressionist music. Debussy was among the most influential composers of the late 19th and early 20th centuries, and his use of non-traditional scales and chromaticism influenced many composers who followed. Debussy's music is noted for its sensory content and frequent usage of atonality. The two composers invented new musical forms and new sounds. Ravel's piano compositions, such as Jeux d'eau, Miroirs, Le tombeau de Couperin and Gaspard de la nuit, demand considerable virtuosity. His mastery of orchestration is evident in the Rapsodie espagnole, Daphnis et Chloé, his arrangement of Modest Mussorgsky's Pictures at an Exhibition and his orchestral work Boléro (1928). More recently, in the middle of the 20th century, Maurice Ohana, Pierre Schaeffer and Pierre Boulez contributed to the evolution of contemporary classical music.

French music then followed the rapid emergence of pop and rock music in the middle of the 20th century. Although English-speaking creations achieved popularity in the country, French pop music, known as chanson française, has also remained very popular. Among the most important French artists of the century are Édith Piaf, Georges Brassens, Léo Ferré, Charles Aznavour and Serge Gainsbourg. Although there are very few rock bands in France compared to English-speaking countries, bands such as Noir Désir, Mano Negra, Niagara, Les Rita Mitsouko and more recently Superbus, Phoenix and Gojira, or Shaka Ponk, have reached worldwide popularity.

Other French artists with international careers have been popular in several countries, most notably female singers Dalida, Mireille Mathieu, Mylène Farmer, Alizée and Nolwenn Leroy, electronic music pioneers Jean-Michel Jarre, Laurent Garnier and Bob Sinclar, later Martin Solveig and David Guetta. In the 1990s and 2000s (decade), electronic duos Daft Punk, Justice and Air also reached worldwide popularity and contributed to the reputation of modern electronic music in the world.

Among current musical events and institutions in France, many are dedicated to classical music and operas. The most prestigious institutions are the state-owned Paris National Opera (with its two sites Palais Garnier and Opéra Bastille), the Opéra National de Lyon, the Théâtre du Châtelet in Paris, the Théâtre du Capitole in Toulouse and the Grand Théâtre de Bordeaux. As for music festivals, there are several events organised, the most popular being Eurockéennes (a word play which sounds in French as "European"), Solidays and Rock en Seine. The Fête de la Musique, imitated by many foreign cities, was first launched by the French Government in 1982. Major music halls and venues in France include Le Zénith sites present in many cities and other places in Paris (Paris Olympia, Théâtre Mogador, Élysée Montmartre).

Cinema

France has historical and strong links with cinema, with two Frenchmen, Auguste and Louis Lumière (known as the Lumière Brothers) credited with creating cinema in 1895. The world's first female filmmaker, Alice Guy-Blaché, was also from France. Several important cinematic movements, including the late 1950s and 1960s Nouvelle Vague, began in the country. It is noted for having a strong film industry, due in part to protections afforded by the Government of France. France remains a leader in filmmaking,  producing more films than any other European country. The nation also hosts the Cannes Festival, one of the most important and famous film festivals in the world.

Apart from its strong and innovative film tradition, France has also been a gathering spot for artists from across Europe and the world. For this reason, French cinema is sometimes intertwined with the cinema of foreign nations. Directors from nations such as Poland (Roman Polanski, Krzysztof Kieślowski, Andrzej Żuławski), Argentina (Gaspar Noé, Edgardo Cozarinsky), Russia (Alexandre Alexeieff, Anatole Litvak), Austria (Michael Haneke) and Georgia (Géla Babluani, Otar Iosseliani) are prominent in the ranks of French cinema. Conversely, French directors have had prolific and influential careers in other countries, such as Luc Besson, Jacques Tourneur or Francis Veber in the United States. Although the French film market is dominated by Hollywood, France is the only nation in the world where American films make up the smallest share of total film revenues, at 50%, compared with 77% in Germany and 69% in Japan. French films account for 35% of the total film revenues of France, which is the highest percentage of national film revenues in the developed world outside the United States, compared to 14% in Spain and 8% in the UK. France is 2013 the 2nd exporter of films in the world after the United States.

France historically was the cultural centre of the world, although its dominant position has been surpassed by the United States. Today, France takes steps in protecting and promoting its culture, becoming a leading advocate of cultural exception. The nation succeeded in convincing all EU members to refuse to include culture and audiovisuals in the list of liberalised sectors of the WTO in 1993. Moreover, this decision was confirmed in a vote by UNESCO in 2005: the principle of "cultural exception" won an overwhelming victory with 198 countries voting for it and only 2 countries, the United States and Israel, voting against it.

Fashion

Fashion has been an important industry and cultural export of France since the 17th century, and modern "haute couture" originated in Paris in the 1860s. Today, Paris, along with London, Milan, and New York City, is considered one of the world's fashion capitals, and the city is home or headquarters to many of the premier fashion houses. The expression Haute couture is, in France, a legally protected name, guaranteeing certain quality standards.

The association of France with fashion and style dates largely to the reign of Louis XIV when the luxury goods industries in France came increasingly under royal control and the French royal court became, arguably, the arbiter of taste and style in Europe. But France renewed its dominance of the high fashion industry in the years 1860–1960 through the establishment of the great couturier houses such as Chanel, Dior, and Givenchy. The French perfume industry is the world leader in its sector and is centred on the town of Grasse.

In the 1960s, the elitist "Haute couture" came under criticism from France's youth culture. In 1966, the designer Yves Saint Laurent broke with established Haute Couture norms by launching a prêt-à-porter ("ready to wear") line and expanding French fashion into mass manufacturing. With a greater focus on marketing and manufacturing, new trends were established by Sonia Rykiel, Thierry Mugler, Claude Montana, Jean-Paul Gaultier and Christian Lacroix in the 1970s and 1980s. The 1990s saw a conglomeration of many French couture houses under luxury giants and multinationals such as LVMH.

According to 2017 data compiled by Deloitte, Louis Vuitton Moet Hennessey (LVMH), a French brand, is the largest luxury company in the world by sales, selling more than twice the amount of its nearest competitor. Moreover, France also possesses 3 of the top 10 luxury goods companies by sales (LVMH, Kering SA, L'Oréal), more than any other country in the world.

Media

In 2021, regional daily newspapers (like Ouest-France, Sud Ouest, La Voix du Nord, Dauphiné Libéré, Le Télégramme, and Le Progrès) more than doubled the sales of national newspapers (like Le Monde, Le Figaro, L'Équipe (sports), Le Parisien, and Les Echos (finance)). Free dailies, distributed in metropolitan centers, continue to increase their market share.

The sector of weekly magazines includes more than 400 specialised weekly magazines published in the country.

The most influential news magazines are the left-wing Le Nouvel Observateur, centrist L'Express and right-wing Le Point (in 2009 more than 400,000 copies), but the highest circulation numbers for weeklies are attained by TV magazines and by women's magazines, among them Marie Claire and ELLE, which have foreign versions. Influential weeklies also include investigative and satirical papers Le Canard Enchaîné and Charlie Hebdo, as well as Paris Match. As in most industrialised nations, the print media have been affected by a severe crisis with the rise of the internet. In 2008, the government launched a major initiative to help the sector reform and become financially independent, but in 2009 it had to give 600,000 euros to help the print media cope with the economic crisis, in addition to existing subsidies.

In 1974, after years of centralised monopoly on radio and television, the governmental agency ORTF was split into several national institutions, but the three already-existing TV channels and four national radio stations remained under state control. It was only in 1981 that the government allowed free broadcasting in the territory, ending the state monopoly on radio. French television was partly liberalised in the next two-decade with the creation of several commercial channels, mainly thanks to cable and satellite television. In 2005 the national service Télévision Numérique Terrestre introduced digital television all over the territory, allowing the creation of other channels.

The four existing national channels are owned by the state-owned consortium France Télévisions, funded by advertising revenue and TV licence fees. Public broadcasting group Radio France runs five national radio stations. Among these public media are Radio France Internationale, which broadcasts programmes in French all over the world, as well as Franco-German TV channel TV5 Monde. In 2006, the government created the global news channel France 24.

Society

According to a BBC poll in 2010, based on 29,977 responses in 28 countries, France is globally seen as a positive influence in the world's affairs: 49% have a positive view of the country's influence, whereas 19% have a negative view. The Nation Brand Index of 2008 suggested that France has the second best international reputation, only behind Germany. A global opinion poll for the BBC saw France ranked the fourth most positively viewed nation in the world (behind Germany, Canada and the United Kingdom) in 2014.

According to a poll in 2011, the French were found to have the highest level of religious tolerance and to be the country where the highest proportion of the population defines its identity primarily in term of nationality and not religion. , 75% of French had a favourable view of the United States, making France one of the most pro-American countries in the world. , the favourable view of the United States had dropped to 46%. In January 2010, the magazine International Living ranked France as "best country to live in", ahead of 193 other countries, for the fifth year running.

The OECD Better Life Index states that "France performs well in many measures of well-being relative to most other countries in the Better Life Index".

The French Revolution continues to permeate the country's collective memory. The tricolour flag of France, the anthem "La Marseillaise", and the motto Liberté, égalité, fraternité, defined in Title 1 of the Constitution as national symbols, all emerged during the cultural ferment of the early revolution, along with Marianne, a common national personification. In addition, Bastille Day, the national holiday, commemorates the storming of the Bastille on 14 July 1789.

A common and traditional symbol of the French people is the Gallic rooster. Its origins date back to Antiquity since the Latin word Gallus meant both "rooster" and "inhabitant of Gaul". Then this figure gradually became the most widely shared representation of the French, used by French monarchs, then by the Revolution and under the successive republican regimes as representation of the national identity, used for some stamps and coins.

France is one of the world leaders of gender equality in the workplace: as of 2017, it has 36.8% of its corporate board seats held by women, which makes it the leader of the G20 for that metric. It was ranked in 2019 by the World Bank as one of the only six countries in the world where women have the same work rights as men.

France is one of the most liberal countries in the world when it comes to LGBT rights: a 2020 Pew Research Center poll found that 86% of the French think that same-sex relationships should be accepted by society, one of the highest acceptance rates in the world (comparable to that of other Western European nations). France legalised same-sex marriage and adoption in 2013. The government has used its diplomatic clout to support LGBT rights throughout the world, notably in the United Nations.

In 2020, France was ranked fifth in the Environmental Performance Index (behind the United Kingdom), out of 180 countries ranked by Yale University in that study. Being the host country of the 2015 Paris Climate Change Conference, the French Government was instrumental in securing the 2015 Paris Agreement, a success that has been credited to its "openness and experience in diplomacy".

Cuisine

French cuisine is renowned for being one of the finest in the world. Different regions have different styles. In the North, butter and cream are common ingredients, whereas olive oil is more commonly used in the South. Each region of France has iconic traditional specialties: cassoulet in the Southwest, choucroute in Alsace, quiche in the Lorraine region, beef bourguignon in  Burgundy, provençal tapenade, etc. France is most famous for its wines, and cheeses, which are often named for the territory where they are produced (AOC). A meal typically consists of three courses, entrée (starter), plat principal (main course), and fromage (cheese) or dessert, sometimes with a salad served before the cheese or dessert.

French cuisine is also regarded as a key element of the quality of life and the attractiveness of France. A French publication, the Michelin guide, awards Michelin stars for excellence to a select few establishments. The acquisition or loss of a star can have dramatic effects on the success of a restaurant. By 2006, the Michelin Guide had awarded 620 stars to French restaurants.

In addition to its wine tradition, France is also a major producer of beer and rum. The three main French brewing regions are Alsace (60% of national production), Nord-Pas-de-Calais and Lorraine. French rum is made in distilleries located on islands in the Atlantic and Indian oceans.

Sports

France hosts "the world's biggest annual sporting event", the Tour de France. Other popular sports played in France include: football, judo, tennis, rugby union and pétanque. France has hosted events such as the 1938 and 1998 FIFA World Cups, the 2007 Rugby World Cup, and will host the 2023 Rugby World Cup. The country also hosted the 1960 European Nations' Cup, UEFA Euro 1984, UEFA Euro 2016 and 2019 FIFA Women's World Cup. The Stade de France in Saint-Denis is France's largest stadium and was the venue for the 1998 FIFA World Cup and 2007 Rugby World Cup finals. Since 1923, France is famous for its 24 Hours of Le Mans sports car endurance race. Several major tennis tournaments take place in France, including the Paris Masters and the French Open, one of the four Grand Slam tournaments. French martial arts include Savate and Fencing.

France has a close association with the Modern Olympic Games; it was a French aristocrat, Baron Pierre de Coubertin, who suggested the Games' revival, at the end of the 19th century. After Athens was awarded the first Games, in reference to the Olympics' Greek origins, Paris hosted the second Games in 1900. Paris was the first home of the International Olympic Committee, before it moved to Lausanne. Since 1900, France has hosted the Olympics on 4 further occasions: the 1924 Summer Olympics, again in Paris and three Winter Games (1924 in Chamonix, 1968 in Grenoble and 1992 in Albertville). Similar to the Olympics, France introduced Olympics for the deaf people (Deaflympics) in 1924 with the idea of a French deaf car mechanic, Eugène Rubens-Alcais who paved the way to organise the inaugural edition of the Summer Deaflympics in Paris.

Both the national football team and the national rugby union team are nicknamed "Les Bleus" in reference to the team's shirt colour as well as the national French tricolour flag. Football is the most popular sport in France, with over 1,800,000 registered players and over 18,000 registered clubs. The football team is among the most successful in the world, with two FIFA World Cup victories in 1998 and 2018, two FIFA World Cup second places in 2006 and 2022, and two UEFA European Championships in 1984 and 2000.

The top national football club competition is Ligue 1. France has produced some of the greatest players in the world, including three-time FIFA World Player of the Year Zinedine Zidane, three-time Ballon d'Or recipient Michel Platini, record holder for most goals scored at a World Cup Just Fontaine, first football player to receive the Légion d'honneur Raymond Kopa, and the record goalscorer for the French national team Thierry Henry.

The French Open, also called Roland-Garros, is a major tennis tournament held over two weeks between late May and early June at the Stade Roland-Garros in Paris. It is the premier clay court tennis championship event in the world and the second of four annual Grand Slam tournaments.

Rugby union is popular, particularly in Paris and the southwest of France. The national rugby union team has competed at every Rugby World Cup; it takes part in the annual Six Nations Championship.

See also

 Outline of France

Footnotes

References

Further reading
 "France." in Europe, edited by Ferdie McDonald and Claire Marsden, Dorling Kindersley (Gale, 2010), pp. 144–217. Online.

Topics
 Carls, Alice-Catherine. "France." in World Press Encyclopedia, edited by Amanda C. Quick, (2nd ed., vol. 1, Gale, 2003), pp. 314–337. Online coverage of press and media.
 Chabal, Emile, ed. France since the 1970s: History, Politics and Memory in an Age of Uncertainty (2015) Excerpt.
 Gildea, Robert. France Since 1945 (2nd ed. Oxford University Press, 2002).
 Goodliffe, Gabriel, and Riccardo Brizzi, eds. France After 2012 (Bergham, 2015).
 Haine, W. S. Culture and Customs of France (Greenwood Press, 2006).
 Kelly, Michael, ed. French Culture and Society: The Essentials (Oxford University Press, 2001).
 Raymond, Gino. Historical Dictionary of France (2nd ed. Scarecrow, 2008).
Jones, Colin. Cambridge Illustrated History of France (Cambridge University Press, 1999).
Ancient maps of France from the Eran Laor Cartographic Collection. National Library of Israel.

External links

 France at Organisation for Economic Co-operation and Development
 France at UCB Libraries GovPubs
 
 France at the EU
 
 
 Key Development Forecasts for France from International Futures

Economy
 
 OECD France statistics

Government
 France.fr – official French tourism site 
  Gouvernement.fr – official site of the government 
 Official site of the French public service – links to various administrations and institutions
 Official site of the National Assembly

Culture
 Contemporary French Civilization – journal, University of Illinois
 FranceGuide – official site of the French Government Tourist Office

 
Countries in Europe
French-speaking countries and territories
G20 nations
Member states of NATO
Member states of the European Union
Member states of the Organisation internationale de la Francophonie
Member states of the Union for the Mediterranean
Member states of the United Nations
Republics
Member states of the Council of Europe
Southwestern European countries
Western European countries
States and territories established in 1792
1792 establishments in France
1792 establishments in Europe
Transcontinental countries
OECD members